= Baltic Governorates =

Administrative units of the Russian Empire in the Baltic region (1721-1918)

Baltic Governorates Прибалтийские губернии (Russian) Pribaltiyskiye gubernii
- 1721–1918
- Coat of arms

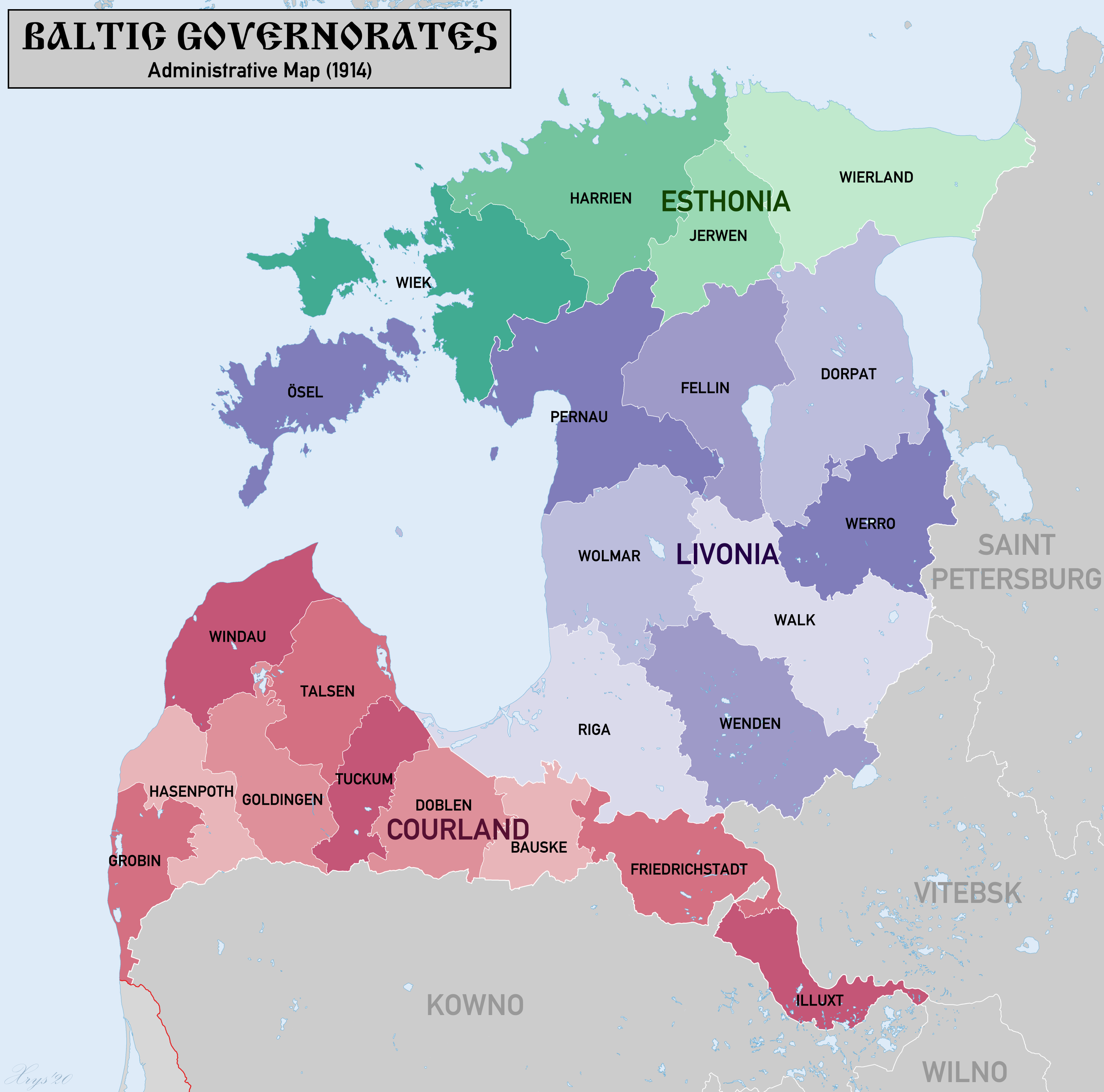
- Map of Baltic governorates, which were the governorates of Courland, Livonia, and Estonia
- Status: Governorate in the Russian Empire
- Government: Monarchy
- Emperor
  - 1721-1725 (first): Peter I
  - 1894-1917 (last): Nicholas II
- Governor-General
  - 1710–1726 (first): Alexander Danilovich Menshikov
  - 1870–1876 (office abolished): Pyotr Romanovich Bagration
- Historical era: Russian Empire
  - Capitulation of Estonia and Livonia: 1710
  - Treaty of Nystad: 1721
  - Annexation of Courland and Semigallia: 1795
  - Treaty of Brest-Litovsk: 3 March 1918

Area
- 1897: 94,567.57 km^{2} (36,512.74 sq mi)

Population
  - 1897: 2,386,181
Preceded by
Duchy of Estonia (1561–1721)
Swedish Livonia
Duchy of Courland and Semigallia
Succeeded by
Ober Ost
United Baltic Duchy
Estonia
Latvia
- Today part of: Estonia; Latvia

The Baltic Governorates, (Note: Russian: Прибалтийские губернии, pre-reform orthography: Прибалтійскіе губерніи, romanized: Pribaltiyskiye gubernii) originally the Ostsee Governorates, (Note: German: Ostseegouvernements; Russian: Остзейские губернии, pre-reform orthography: Остзейскіе губерніи, romanized: Ostzeyskiye gubernii) were the administrative units of the Russian Empire established in the territories of Swedish Estonia, Swedish Livonia (1721), and later the Duchy of Courland and Semigallia (1795).

Although they did not constitute a unified administrative entity, the three governorates were also referred to as the Baltic Krai (Russian: Прибалтийский край) or Ostsee Krai, as they had much in common and differed considerably from the rest of Russia.

== History ==
The Treaty of Vilnius of 1561 included the Privilegium Sigismundi Augusti by which the Polish King Sigismund II Augustus guaranteed the Livonian estates several privileges, including religious freedom with respect to the Augsburg Confession, the Indigenat (Polish: Indygenat), and continuation of the traditional German jurisdiction and administration. The terms regarding religious freedom forbade any regulation of the traditional Protestant order by religious or secular authorities, and ruled that cases of disagreements be judged only by Protestant scholars. When in 1710 Estonia and Livonia capitulated to Russia during the Great Northern War, the capitulations explicitly referred to the Privilegium Sigismundi Augusti, with the respective references being confirmed in the Treaty of Nystad (1721).

The dominions of Swedish Estonia (in what is now northern Estonia) and Swedish Livonia (in what is now southern Estonia and northern Latvia) became the governorates of Reval and Riga when they were conquered by Russia during the Great Northern War, and then ceded by Sweden in the Treaty of Nystad in 1721. Notably, both Reval Governorate and Riga Governorate were each at the time subdivided into one province only: the province of Estonia and the province of Livonia, respectively. In the period of the so-called Regency (or Namestnichestvo), 1783–1796, the Regent's (later Governor-General's) Office in Riga was created. It consisted of two subdivisions dealing with local matters and Russian affairs.

After an administrative reform in 1796, the Reval Governorate was renamed the Estland Governorate (Russian: Эстляндская губерния), and the Riga Governorate was renamed the Livland Governorate (Russian: Лифляндская губерния). The third Baltic province, Courland, was annexed into the Russian Empire after the third partition of the Polish–Lithuanian Commonwealth in 1795.

The Baltic Governor-General (Russian: Прибалтийский генерал-губернатор) was the representative of the Russian Emperor in the provinces of Livland, Estland, and Courland. He was appointed by the Emperor and was subject to the latter as well as to the Senate. His duties were regulated by laws and instructions from central authorities. From the beginning of the 19th century, he acted as an intermediate between the ministries in Saint Petersburg and the administration of the Baltic governorates on the spot.

The Governor-General, the highest local executive official and military authority, was in charge of the internal order in the provinces and had to take care of their overall security. He was in charge of recruiting troops and had to keep an eye on the garrisons and fortifications. His civil duties included supervising the provincial administration and prisons, maintaining land roads and bridges, issuing passports, and overseeing the collection of state taxes and customs duties. He appointed and dismissed higher officials. The Office of the Baltic Governor-General was abolished at the beginning of the Russification in the Baltic Provinces in 1876.

Similar to the guberniyas of the autonomous Grand Duchy of Finland, the Baltic Governorates were not subject to the common civil and administrative laws of the Russian Empire until the end of the 19th century. However, they did not have a monetary, fiscal, and passport system of their own. Like the guberniyas of the Kingdom of Poland, they were treated as an integral entity, and Russian law provided them the preservation of local authorities. In the Baltics, these were the Landtags. The special legislation which set rules for municipal administration and entrepreneurship according to local traditions, as well as the privileges of the local nobility, was known under the collective name of Ostsee Right (Russian: Остзейское право).

From the end of the 18th century through 1917, the names and territories of the Courland Governorate, the Livonia Governorate, and the Estonia Governorate remained unchanged. The February Revolution of 1917 was followed by an internal redistribution of Latvian and Estonian lands between the latter two. The October Revolution of 1917 and the Treaty of Brest-Litovsk of 1918 created the prerequisites for the declaration of independence of these governorships from Russia as the independent states of Estonia and Latvia.

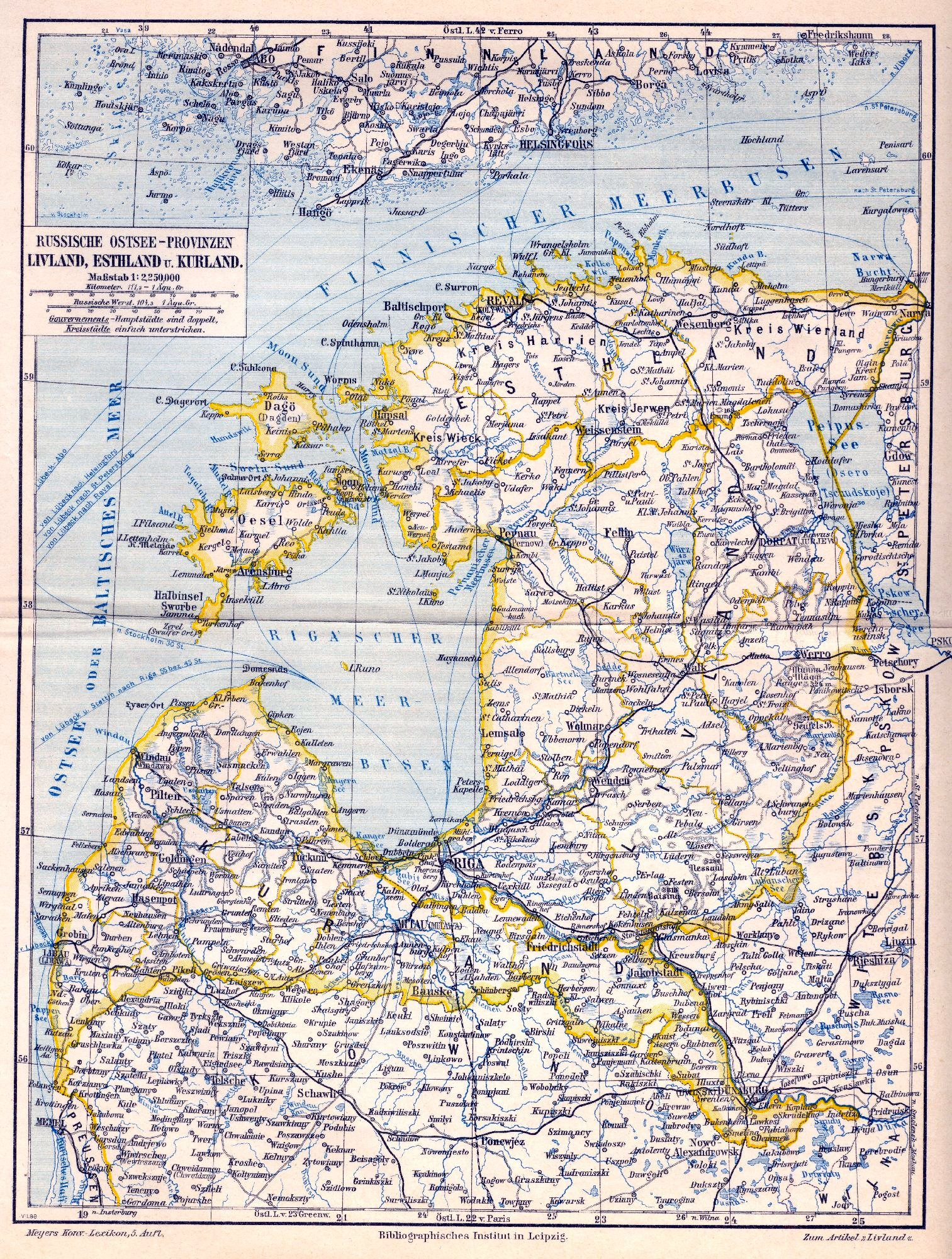
Map of the Baltic Governorates

== List of governors-general ==
- Alexander Menshikov (1710–1719) as governor-general of Ingria
- Fyodor Apraksin (1719–1728)
- Friedrich von Löwen (1728–1736)
- Platon Musin-Pushkin (1736)
- Gustaf Otto Douglas (1736–1740)
- Ulrich Friedrich Woldemar von Löwendal (1740–1743)
- Duke Peter August of Schleswig-Holstein-Sonderburg-Beck (1743–1753, 1758–1775)
- Vladimir Dolgorukov (1753–1758)
- George Browne (1775–1792)
- Nicholas Repnin (1792–1798)
- Ludwig von Nagel (1798–1800)
- Peter Ludwig von der Pahlen (1800–1801)
- Sergey Golitsyn (1801–1803)
- Friedrich Wilhelm von Buxhoeveden (1803–1808)
- Duke George of Oldenburg (1808–1809)
- Berend Johann von Uexküll (1809–1811, 1816–1818)
- Grand Duke Augustus of Oldenburg (1811–1816)
- Filippo Paulucci (1818–1829)
- Carl Magnus von der Pahlen (1829–1845)
- Yevgeny Golovin (1845–1847)
- Alexander Suvorov (1848–1861)
- Wilhelm Heinrich von Lieven (1861–1864)
- Pyotr Shuvalov (1864–1866)
- Eduard Baranov (1866)
- Pyotr Albedinsky (1866–1870)
- Pyotr Bagration (1870–1876)

Office abolished in 1876; administrative functions transferred to the Ministry of the Interior.

== The Three Governorates ==
Coat of arms	Name	Russian (Transliteration)	Historic German Name	Current Territory
	Estonia Governorate (Estland)	Эстляндская губерния (Estlyandskaya guberniya)	Estländisches Gouvernement	North Estonia
	Livonia Governorate (Livland)	Лифляндская губерния (Liflyandskaya guberniya)	Livländisches Gouvernement	South Estonia, North Latvia (Vidzeme)
	Courland Governorate (Kurland)	Курля́ндская губерния (Kurlyandskaya guberniya)	Kurländisches Gouvernement	West & South Latvia (Kurzeme, Zemgale, Selonia)

== See also ==
- Administrative division of Congress Poland
- Lithuania Governorate
