= Battle of Stallupönen =

1914 battle on the Eastern Front of World War I

Coordinates: 54°37′50″N 22°34′24″E

- Part of the Eastern Front of World War I
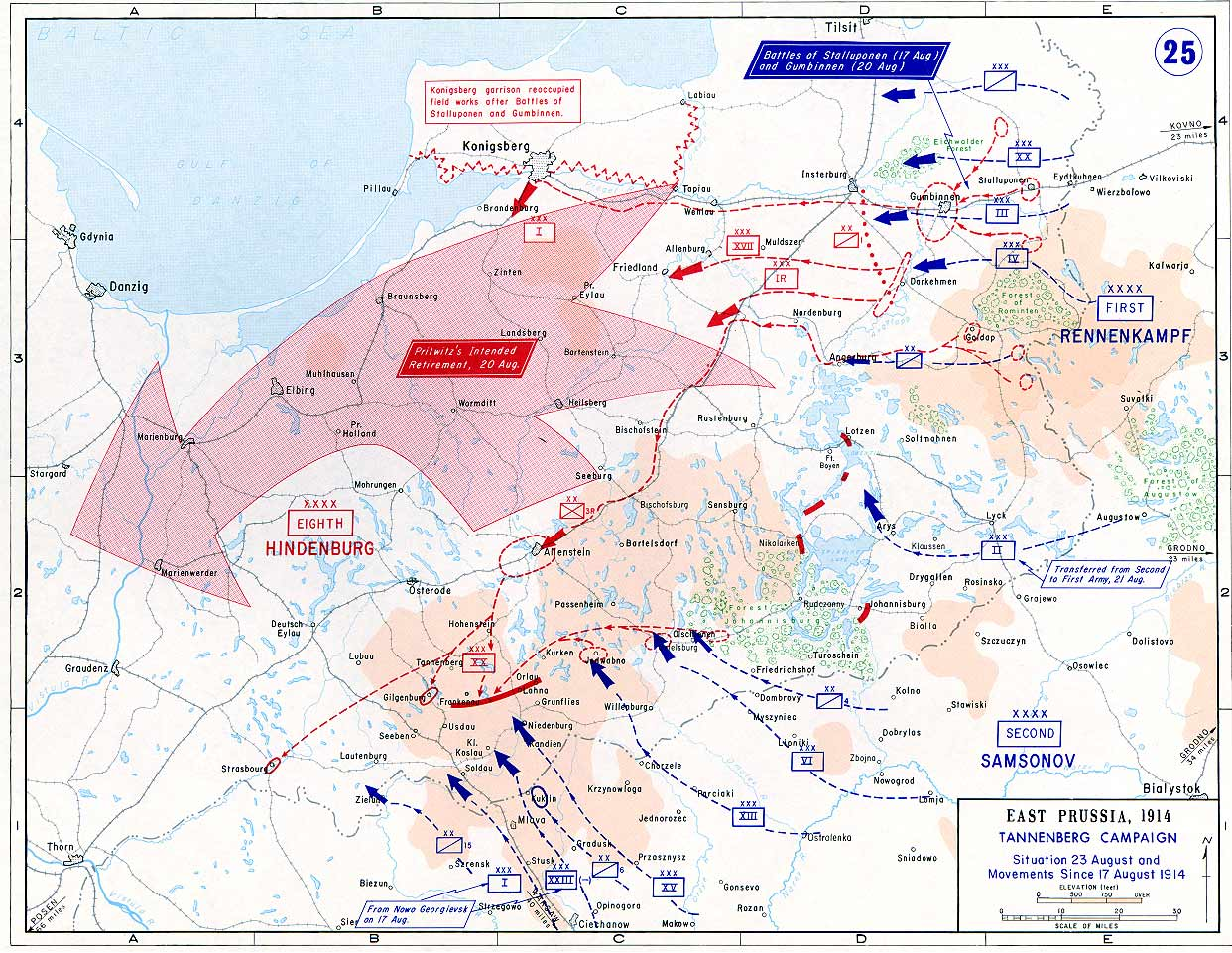
- Eastern Front, August 17–23, 1914.
Date	17 August [O.S. 4 August] 1914
Location	Stallupönen, East Prussia (now Nesterov, Russia)
Result	German victory

Belligerents
German Empire	Russian Empire

Commanders and leaders
(German Empire) Hermann von François	Paul von Rennenkampf

Units involved
(German Empire) I Corps	25th Infantry Division; 27th Infantry Division; 29th Infantry Division; 40th Infantry Division

Strength
18,000	50,000

Casualties and losses
1,500	619 killed 2,382 wounded 4,466 captured Total: 7,467

The Battle of Stallupönen, fought between Russian and German armies on August 17, 1914, was the opening battle of World War I on the Eastern Front. The Germans under the command of Hermann von François conducted a successful counterattack against four Russian infantry divisions from different infantry corps, which heavily outnumbered them but were separated from each other, creating a gap between the 27th Infantry Division and the 40th Infantry Division, and had little coordination with each other. The Germans retreated to Gumbinnen thereafter.

== Prelude ==
According to Prit Buttar:

The Dual Alliance and Franco-Russian Treaty, and the obligations contained within them, would prove to be major mechanisms in the outbreak of war in 1914. The obligations of interlocking treaties now imposed themselves upon the plans and intentions of the military commanders. Russia had mobilised with a view to attacking Austria-Hungary in support of Serbia, but as German mobilisation would result in a major attack on France, the Russians had to devote the main strength of their regular army to launching an early attack on East Prussia in an attempt to draw off German troops from the Western Front.

Germany's attack on France followed the Schlieffen Plan, a flanking advance through Belgium, with limited forces opposing Russia until a rapid victory over France freed up troops for the Eastern Front. France was counting on an early Russian attack on Germany, forcing the German redeployment of troops from the Western Front. Likewise, Russia was optimistic a quick attack on East Prussia to the Vistula would be decisive, allowing Russia to attack Galicia.

Russia deployed the 1st Army, commanded by Paul von Rennenkampf, and the 2nd Army, commanded by Alexander Samsonov, for the attack. Combined Russian forces consisted of 208 infantry battalions, and over nine cavalry divisions with 192 squadrons. The 1st Army would attack north of the Masurian Lakes, while the 2nd Army attacked from the south. Germany defended East Prussia with the 8th Army, commanded by Maximilian von Prittwitz, consisting of 100 battalions, supported by reserve and Landwehr formations. German defenses included fortifications along the Masurian Lakes, the Königsberg fortifications, and the Toruń Fortress.

Anticipating that the Russians would attack north of the Rominter Heath, then west along the Pregel Valley, Prittwitz ordered Hermann von François' I Corps to take up positions along the Angerapp river. However, François advocated a forward defense, and by 13 August, had advanced his corps along a line from Goldap to Stallupönen, 32 km east of his orders. On 15 August Rennenkampf crossed the border with six infantry divisions, intending to follow the railway through Stallupönen and Gumbinnen.

== Battle ==
On 15 August, François' men encountered 1st Army's reconnaissance units northeast of Stallupönen, and captured Eydtkuhnen that night as the Russians withdrew. On 16 August, Prittwitz ordered François back to Gumbinnen as he moved the 8th Army to the Angerapp, after his Flieger Abteilung 16 reconnaissance flight spotted the 2nd Army concentrating. However, François kept his 1st Division at Stallupönen, and his 2nd Division divided between Galdap and Tollmingkehmen.

On 17 August, Rennenkampf advanced with all three of his infantry corps, but in an uncoordinated fashion. His cavalry was to the north, while the 20th Army Corps, with the 28th and 29th Infantry Divisions, north of the road, and the 3rd Army Corps, with the 25th and 27th Infantry Divisions on the road and south of it. The 4th Army Corps, with the 40th and 30th infantry divisions were advancing on the Rominte Heath further south. François called up General Adalbert von Falk's 2nd Division in Tollmingkehmen, and his howitzers in Gumbinnen, to reinforce his position in Stallupönen as the battle intensified by mid-day. At 1:00 pm, Prittwitz's envoy arrived, and ordered François to retreat to Gumbinnen. François' reply was to

Tell General von Prittwitz that General von François will break off the engagement when the Russians are defeated.

As Falk advanced, he was able to attack the flank of the Russian 27th Infantry Division near Göritten, when a gap formed between the Russian 27th and 40th Infantry divisions.

A furious frontal attack broke the Russian division, which fled eastward, losing 3,000 casualties and 5,000 prisoners, including almost the entirety of the Russian 105th Regiment. 25th divisions achieved some success to the north of Stallupönen and captured several captives and guns, they could not change the outcome of the battle. But the actions of the 29th division had a decisive result, its counterattack to the rear of Francois created a threat of encirclement and the Germans were forced to stop the battle.

== Aftermath ==
The Germans did not use their success, besides, the Russians continued to put pressure, realizing that he could not withstand further battle he instead ordered a withdrawal to Gumbinnen as ordered. Prittwitz, capitalizing on François' success, moved his forces forward, while François held Gumbinnen.

== Sources ==
- Zayonchkovski, Andrey (2002) [1929]. ru:Первая Мировая Война [The First World War]. St.Petersburg: Poligon. ISBN 5-89173-174-6.
- Airapetov, Oleg (2014). Участие Российской империи в Первой Мировой Войне: 1914 [Participation of the Russian Empire in the First World War: 1914] (in Russian). Кучуково поле. ISBN 978-5-9950-0402-8.
- Buttar, Prit (2014). Collision of Empires: the War on the Eastern Front in 1914. Osprey. ISBN 9781782006480. OCLC 858956311.
- Gilbert, Martin (1994). The First World War: A Complete History. New York: Henry Holt and Company. ISBN 080501540X.
- Badak, A.; Voinech, I.; Wolchek, N. (1997). Всемирная история [Universal history] (in Russian). Volume 19. Ми:Литература. ISBN 985-437-075-5.
- Oleynikov, Alexei (2016). Россия-щит Антанты [Russia-Shield of Entente]. Foreword by Nikolai Starikov. St.Petersburg: Piter. ISBN 978-5-496-01795-4.
