= Anatoly Rosenshield =

Russian general (1860–1929)

Anatoly Nikolaevich Rosenshield von Paulin
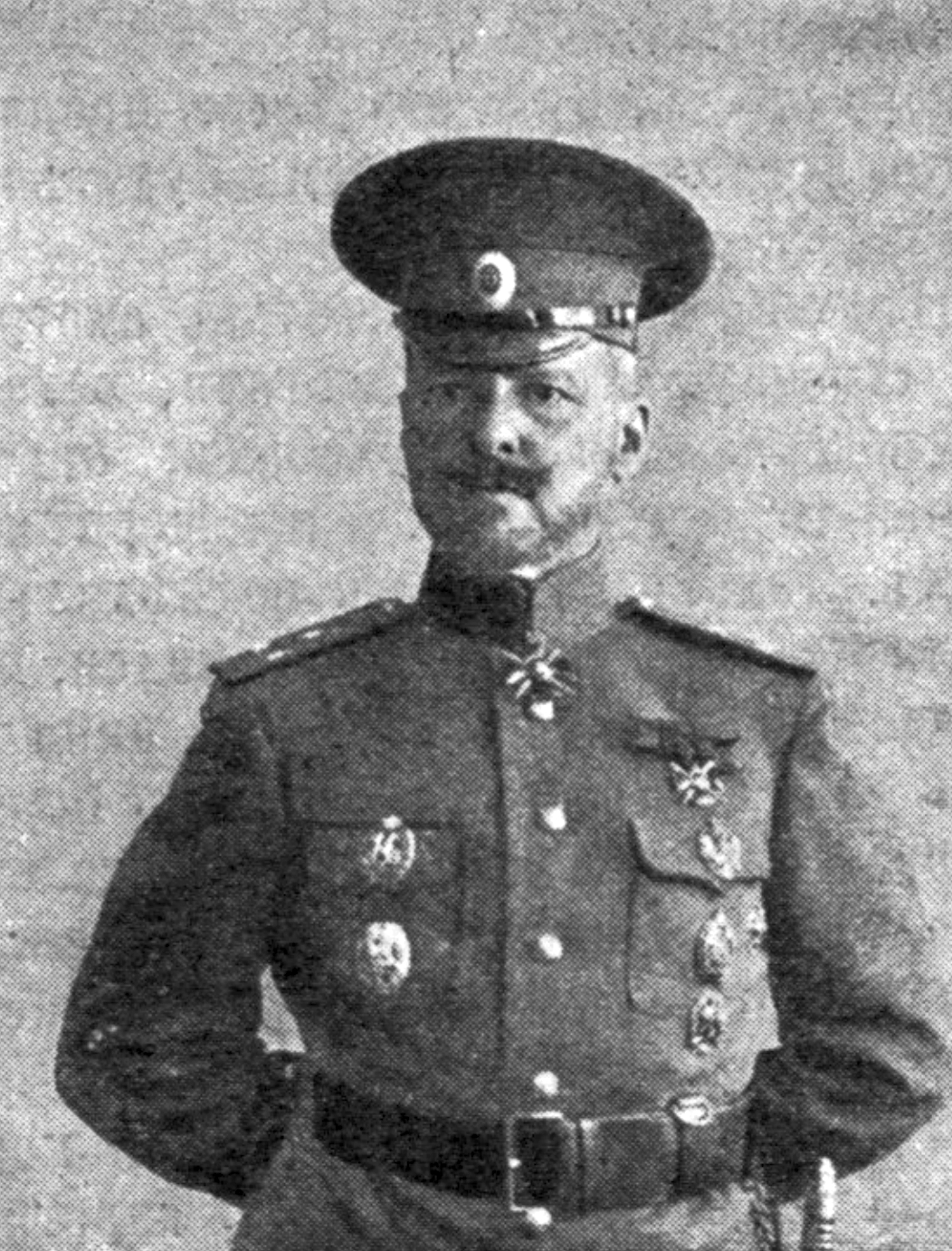
- Born: 10 December 1860 Vitebsk Governorate, Russian Empire
- Died: 22 November 1929 (aged 68) Novi Sad, Kingdom of Yugoslavia
- Allegiance: Russian Empire (Russia) White Movement
- Branch: Imperial Russian Army (Russia) White Army
- Rank: Lieutenant General
- Commands: 2nd Brigade, 12th Infantry Division (Russian Empire); 29th Infantry Division (Russian Empire)
- Conflicts: Russo-Japanese War; World War I; Battle of Stalluponen; Battle of Gumbinnen; Russian Civil War

Anatoly Nikolaevich Rosenshield von Paulin (Russian: Анатолий Николаевич Розеншильд фон Паулин; 10 December 1860 – 22 November 1929) was a Russian military leader and Lieutenant General of the General Staff.

He was Lutheran and from the hereditary nobility of the Vitebsk Governorate.

== Achievement list ==
=== Imperial Russian Army ===
- He graduated from the Polotsk military gymnasium.
- August 26, 1877 - Enlisted in the military.
- August 8, 1879 - Graduated from the 1st Military Pavlovsk School as a senior military cadet. Issued by the ensign in the Life Guards 4th Rifle Imperial Surname Battalion.
- August 30, 1884 - Second Lieutenant.
- January 1, 1885 - Lieutenant.
- 1887 - Graduated from the Nikolaev Academy of the General Staff in the 1st category.
- April 7, 1887 - Headquarters Captain. Appointed to be a member of the Vilna Military District.
- November 26, 1887 - Captain of the General Staff. Senior Adjutant to the Headquarters of the 28th Infantry Division.
- October 15, 1888 - October 14 - 1889 - Qualified command of a company in the 111th Don Infantry Regiment.
- October 5, 1889 - Consisted for special assignments at the headquarters of the III Army Corps.
- August 30, 1891 - Lieutenant Colonel. Headquarters officer for special assignments at the headquarters of the III Army Corps.
- November 2, 1892 - Senior Adjutant to the Headquarters of the Omsk Military District.
- April 2, 1895 - Polkovnik for distinction.
- January 25, 1896 - Headquarters officer for special assignments at the headquarters of the VII Army Corps.
- April 22, 1896 - Head of the Main Directorate of Cossack troops.
- May 7-September 18, 1897 - The battalion’s censored command was serving in the Life Guards of the Finland Regiment.
- July 24, 1897 - Consisted of the General Staff.
- February 2, 1899 - Head of the unit for the publication of charters and regulations on educational institutions at the General Staff.
- From February 1900 - Retired.
- May 1-September 1, 1901 - He was assigned to the Life Guards of the 4th Rifle Imperial Family Battalion to update combat knowledge.
- October 8, 1901 - At the disposal of the Chief of the General Staff.
- February 3, 1903 - Commander of the 7th Infantry Regiment, with whom he entered the Russo-Japanese War. He was shell-shocked.
- July 1905 - Major General for "military distinctions."
- July 15, 1905 - Commander of the 2nd Brigade of the 10th East Siberian Rifle Division.
- November 19, 1905 - Commander of the Life Guards of the 1st Infantry His Majesty Battalion.
- 1906 - Appointed to His Majesty's Suite.
- December 4, 1907 - February 14, 1909 - Head of the Officer Rifle School.

He became commander of the 2nd Brigade of the 12th Infantry Division (Russian Empire) on February 17, 1909. November 12, 1911 - Commander of the 1st Brigade of the 42nd Infantry Division (Russian Empire).

- May 9, 1914 - Lieutenant General, Head of the 29th Infantry Division.
- August–September 1914 - As part of the 1st Army with participated in the East Prussian operation.
- August 4 (17), 1914 - Battle of Stallupönen. On his own initiative, attacked the 1st Army Corps of General Hermann von Francois, shot down him, capturing prisoners and artillery and forcing him to retreat, thereby deciding the outcome of the battle.
- August 7 (20), 1914 - Battle of Gumbinnen. He saved the position of the entire 1st Army, which was threatened with a detour, reflecting a three-fold superior enemy force.
- October–November 1914 - Participated in the second campaign in East Prussia.
- February 1915 - As part of the XX Army Corps, he was surrounded in the Augustow Forests. Surrendered.
- April 3, 1915 - Dismissed from the post for being in captivity.

=== White movement ===
- Late 1918 - After being released from captivity, he arrived in the Volunteer Army and, after a short stay in the "reserve of ranks," led the training of instructors in the machine gun case.
- August 1919 - Participated in the occupation of Odessa, after which he led the detachment of Odessa volunteers, with whom he advanced on the Kiev direction as part of the troops of the Novorossiysk region of the All-Union Union of Liberal Democratic Forces, General Schilling. On October 8, 1919, the head of the Dniester detachment consisting of: Crimean Horse and Combined-Dragoon Regiments, Separate Combined Infantry Battalion, light battery and armored train.

Pointing to the map on the left flank of our endlessly stretched front, where the combined detachment of General Rosenshild-Paulin acted, General Denikin, smiling, remarked: "Even Rosenshild-Paulin, and he is moving forward non-stop. Than he beats the enemy - the Lord knows. Scraped some parts and fights ... " - Pyotr Wrangel

- Autumn 1919 - He fought successfully against the Petlyura troops on the right bank of the Dnieper. In the area of Vapnyarka captured large trophies, including artillery.
- March 1920 - During the evacuation from Novorossiysk, he fell into the hold of the ship and broke his leg. He was sent for treatment in Serbia.

He lived in exile in Novi Sad, where he was hired by the infantry inspection department of the Ministry of War of the Kingdom of Yugoslavia. He enjoyed great authority among the Russian and Serbian military.

He died on November 22, 1929. He was buried in Novi Sad at a local cemetery.

== Awards ==
- 1892 - Order of St. Anna, 3rd degree
- 1898 - Order of St. Stanislav, 2nd degree
- 1904 - Order of St. Anna, 2nd degree
- 1905 - Order of St. Vladimir, 4th degree with swords and bow
- 1905 - Golden weapons (VP October 10, 1905)
- 1907 - Order of St. Vladimir 3rd degree with swords
- 1910 - Order of St. Stanislav 1st degree
- 1913 - Order of St. Anna, 1st degree

Military offices
Preceded by	Commander of the 2nd Brigade, 12th Infantry Division; February 17, 1909 – October 12, 1911	Succeeded by
Preceded by Vladimir Alexandrovich Arkhipov	Commander of the 29th Infantry Division; 1914–1915	Succeeded by Boris Alekseevich Dzichkanets

== Works ==
- 29th infantry. division in the first campaign in East Prussia
- The death of the XX Army Corps in the August forests
- Diary: Memoirs of the campaign of 1914-1915. M., 2015.

== Sources ==
- "Anatoly Rosenshield" (in Russian). «Russian army in a Great war» project.
