= 2nd Guards Infantry Division (Russian Empire) =

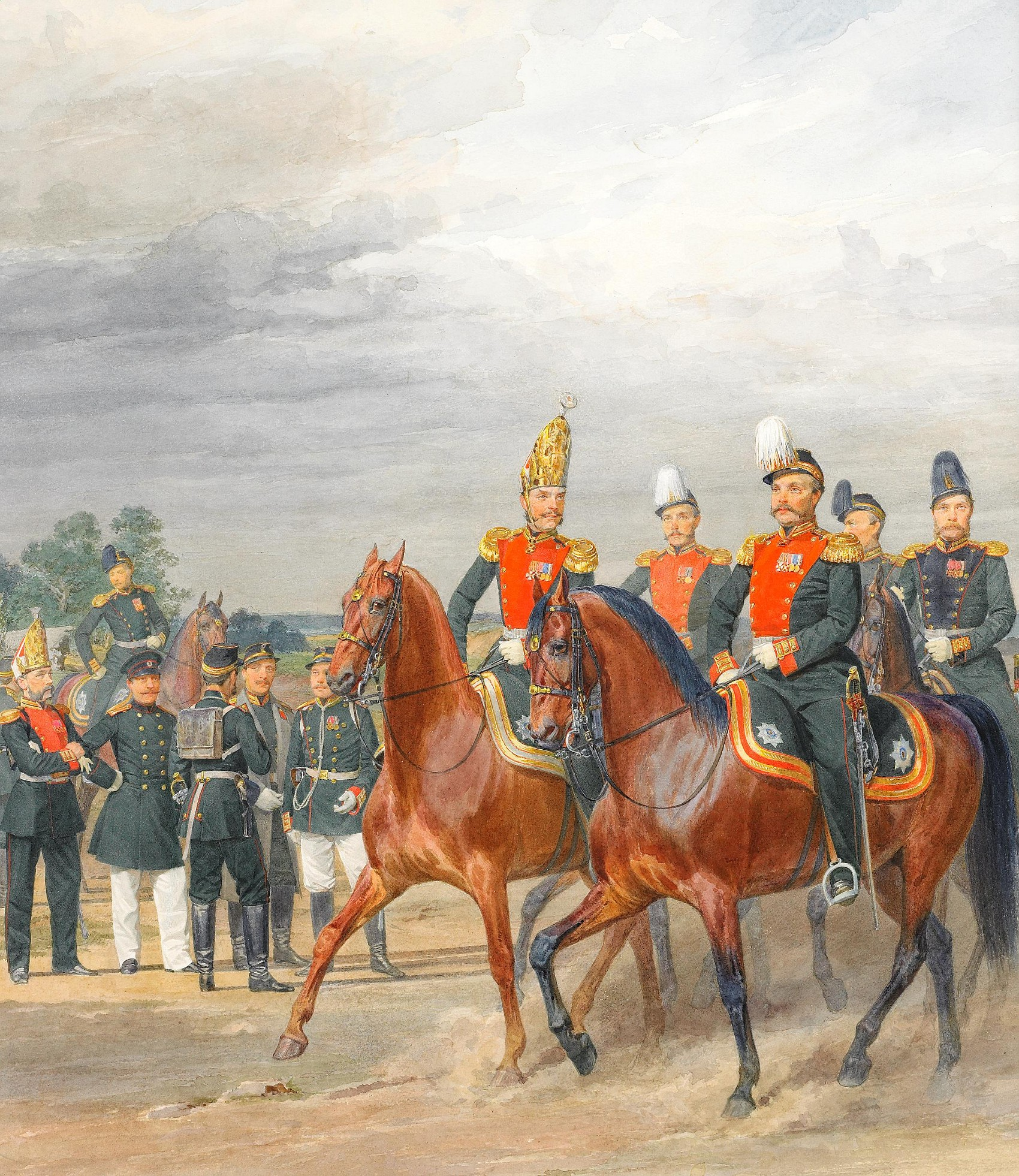
- Active: 1855—1914
- Country: Russian Empire
- Branch: Imperial Russian Army
- Type: Artillery; Infantry
- Size: Division
- Garrison/HQ: Saint Petersburg

The 2nd Guards Infantry Division was a division of the Imperial Russian Army. Before mobilisation for World War I, the division was based in St-Petersburg under the Guards Corps, also headquartered in St-Petersburg.

== Organisation ==
(Titles in English)

Organisation of the division just before mobilisation for World War I;

- Divisional Headquarters and Staff
- 1st Brigade
  - Brigade Headquarters and Staff
  - The Moscow Life Guards Regiment
  - Life Grenadier Guards
- 2nd Brigade
  - Brigade Headquarters and Staff
  - Pavlovski Life Guard Grenadiers
  - Finnish Life Guards Regiment
- 2nd Guards Artillery Brigade
  - Regiment Headquarters and Staff
  - 1st Division (battalion)
  - 2nd Division (battalion)

== Commanders ==
- 1855–1857: Alexander von Wrangel
- 1858–1860: KA Belgard
- 1878–1881: Illarion Ivanovich Vorontsov-Dashkov
- 1881–1885: Timofeyev
- 1891–1895: Stepan Vasilyevich Rykachev
- 1897–1899: Richard Troyanovich Meves
- 1900–1904: Nikolay F Meshetich
- 1905–1906: Vladimir Danilov
- 1906–1907: Ivan Romanenko
- 1907–1908: Adlerberg
- 1908–1910: Mikhnevich
- 1910–1912: Leonid Lesh
- 1912–1913: Vasily Flug
- 1913–1914: Alexander Alexeyevich Resin

== Chiefs of Staff ==
- 1863–1865: Victor Fedorovitch Winberg
- 1865–1866: Kozen

== Commanders of the 1st Brigade ==
- 1913–1914: Kisielewski

== Commanders of the 2nd Brigade ==
- 1893–1894: Richard Troyanovich Meves

== Commanders of the Artillery Brigade ==
- 1901–1904: Arkady Nikanorovich Nishenkov
