= Leonid Lesh =

Russian general (1862–1934)

Leonid Vilgelmovich Lesh
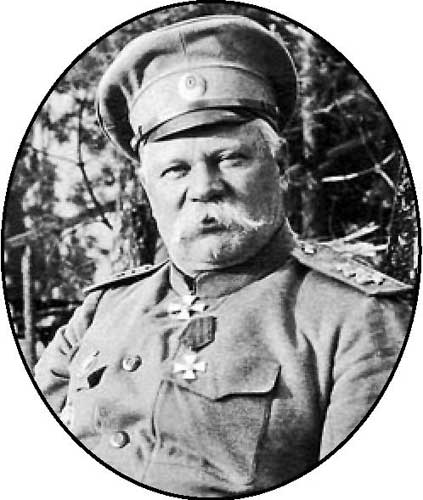
- Born: January 9, 1862; Smolensk Governorate, Russian Empire
- Died: August 28, 1934 (aged 72) Dubrovnik, Kingdom of Yugoslavia
- Allegiance: Russian Empire (Russia) White Movement
- Branch: Imperial Russian Army
- Service years: 1881–1920
- Commands: 1st Siberian Rifle Regiment; 2nd Brigade, 23rd Infantry Division; 2nd Guards Infantry Division; 12th Army Corps; 3rd Army
- Conflicts: Boxer Rebellion; Russo-Japanese War; World War I; Gorlice–Tarnów offensive; Russian Civil War

Leonid Vilgelmovich Lesh (Russian: Леонид Вильгельмович Леш; 9 January 1862 – 28 August 1934) was an Imperial Russian Army commander. He served in the Boxer Rebellion, Russo Japanese War, and World War I.

Lesh took over command of the Third Army during the Gorlice–Tarnów offensive.

After the October Revolution, he sided with the White movement during the Russian Civil War. With the defeat of the White movement, he evacuated from Odessa on 25 January 1920 and emigrated to Yugoslavia. He died in Dubrovnik, Yugoslavia.

== Awards ==
- Gold Sword for Bravery
- Order of Saint George, 4th degree
- Order of Saint George, 3rd degree
- Order of the White Eagle (Russian Empire)
- Order of Saint Anna, 1st class
- Order of Saint Anna, 3rd class
- Order of Saint Stanislaus (House of Romanov), 1st class
- Order of Saint Stanislaus (House of Romanov), 3rd class

Preceded by	Commander of the 1st Siberian Rifle Regiment; 1904–1905	Succeeded by
Preceded by	Commander of the 2nd Brigade, 23rd Infantry Division; 1906–1907	Succeeded by
Preceded by	Commander of the 2nd Guards Infantry Division; 1910–1912	Succeeded by Vasily Flug
Preceded by Aleksei Brusilov	Commander of the 12th Army Corps; 1914–1915	Succeeded by
Preceded by Radko Dimitriev	Commander of the 3rd Army; 1915–1917	Succeeded by Mikhail Kvetsinsky
