= Warsaw Military District (Russian Empire) =

Military district of the Russian Empire

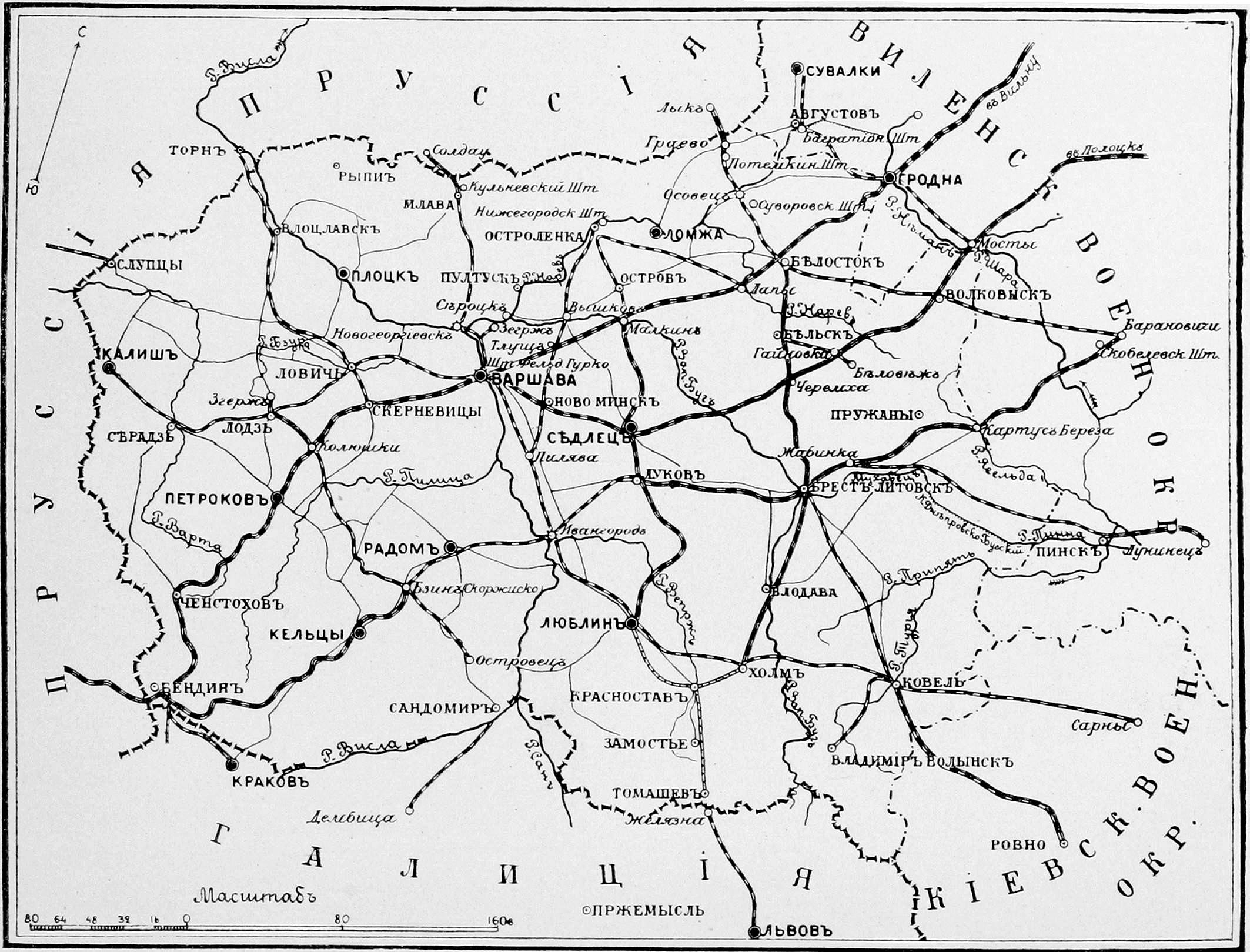
Warsaw Military District (Russian Empire)

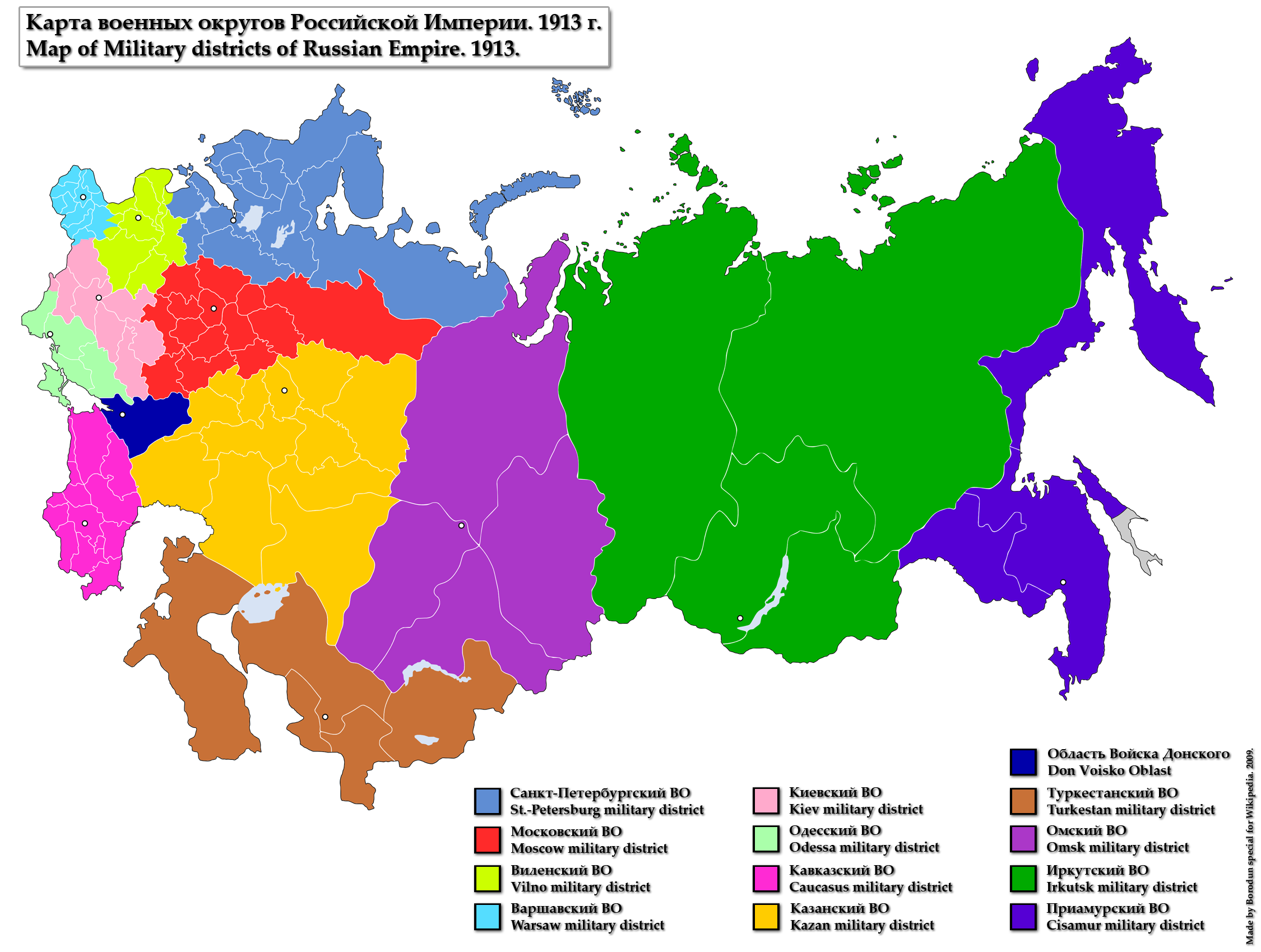
Military Districts of the Russian Empire, 1913

The Warsaw Military District (Russian: Варшавский вое́нный о́круг, romanized: Varshavsky voyenny okrug; Polish: Warszawski Okręg Wojskowy) was a Russian military district of the Imperial Russian Army. It covered the territory of Congress Poland (without the part of Suwałki in Vilno Military District).

The Warsaw Military District was created in 1862 from the territory occupied by the 1st Army. The headquarters staff of the army became the staff of the Warsaw Military District; the staff of the army's 1st Corps became the headquarters of the Vilno Military District and the staff of the 3rd Corps became the headquarters of the Kiev Military District. The army's other corps, 2nd Corps was disbanded and shared among the other districts.

When World War I broke out, most of the units of the district (three out of its five infantry corps) were used to form the 2nd Army. Since the territory of the district was overrun by German and Austro-Hungarian armies in the course of 1915, it was dissolved, and its staff used in creating the new Minsk Military District.

== Composition ==
The Warsaw Military District was an umbrella organisation for all Russian military establishments on its territory. Its main units were five infantry corps:

- 6th Army Corps (headquarters in Łomża)
- 14th Army Corps (headquarters in Lublin)
- 15th Army Corps (headquarters in Warsaw)
- 19th Army Corps (headquarters in Brest)
- 23rd Army Corps (headquarters in Warsaw)

== Commanders ==
- Friedrich Wilhelm Rembert von Berg (1864–74)
- Count Paul Demetrius von Kotzebue (1874–80)
- Pyotr Pavlovich Albedinsky (1880–83)
- Joseph Vladimirovich Gourko (1883–94)
- Pavel Andreyevich Shuvalov (1894–1896)
- Alexander Imeretinsky (1896–1900)
- Mikhail Chertkov (1900–1905)
- Konstantin Maximovich (1905)
- Georgi Skalon (1905–14)
- Yakov Zhilinskiy (1914)
