= Nikolay Turbin =

Nikolay Matveyevich Turbin
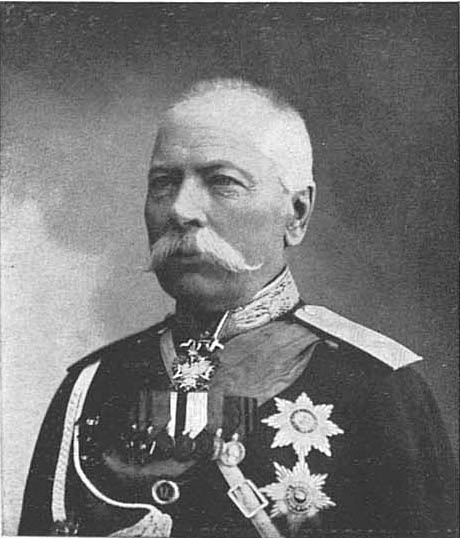
- Born: June 16 (June 4 O.S.), 1832; Yelets, Lipetsk Oblast, Russian Empire
- Died: Unknown
- Military career
- Allegiance: Russian Empire
- Branch: Imperial Russian Army
- Rank: General
- Unit: 29th Infantry Division (Russian Empire)

Nikolay Matveyevich Turbin (June 16 (June 4 O.S.), 1832 – after January 3, 1906) was a General in the Infantry (1902) and Russian archaeologist. He was a full member of the Moscow Archaeological Society (1878) and the organizer and first chairman of the Moscow Numismatic Society (1888).

== Biography ==
Nikolay Turbin was born into a noble family on June 4 (16 O.S.) 1832 in Yelets in Oryol Oblast. At the age of 9, he entered the St. Petersburg Pavlovsk Cadet Corps. Turbin graduated from the Cadet Corps on August 13, 1852, having been appointed to the Jaegersky E. I. V. Grand Duke Mikhail Nikolayevich Regiment. In 1853, the Grenadier Regiment was transferred as ensign in the Life Guards and in 1854 he began to study at the Nikolayev Academy of the General Staff, from which he graduated in 1856. He was assigned to the General Staff and appointed to the service of the Governor-General and Commander of the troops of Eastern Siberia. In January 1858, he was promoted to headquarters captain with transfer to the General Staff. He was sent to inspect the Chinese border and compile a systematic description of the Irkutsk province. In 1859, Turbin headed the convoy of the Imperial Spiritual Mission to Beijing.

In 1862, Turbin returned to the European part of Russia: the division quartermaster of the 2nd Infantry Division (Russian Empire) (March–July 1862), the chief of staff of the 29th Infantry Division (August 1863 - January 1865), the chief of staff of the 30th Infantry Division (Russian Empire) (1865). During the Polish uprising, he was part of the forces of the Vilna Military District (Russian Empire). He was promoted to colonel on August 30, 1865.

From May 30, 1867, he was commander of the 61st Vladimir Infantry Regiment (until January 1877); in 1870 he was given the role of a director of the Mogilev Prison Guardianship Committee. From January 1877 to March 1889, he was Assistant Chief of Staff of the Moscow Military District. During the campaign of 1877–1878, he was a member of the Commission for the preliminary censorship of telegrams received from the war before they were placed in Moscow newspapers. On January 1, 1878, he was promoted to Major General.

He was the head of the Moscow military hospital (from April 29, 1887 to March 13, 1889). He became the commandant of the Vyborg Castle (March 1889 – June 1891) and was promoted to lieutenant general on August 30, 1889.

Head of the 25th Infantry Division (Russian Empire) (June 1891 – March 1896), assistant to the commander of the Priamursky Military District troops with the rank of chairman of the Provisional Administrative Commission for the construction of defensive and barracks premises in the Amur Region (March 1896 – July 1898), assistant commander of the Finland Military District ( May 1902 - April 1905), Member of the Military Council (from April 1905), Acting Finnish Governor-General, Member of the Military Council (July 1905 – January 1906). Dismissed by the general from infantry, with uniform and pension (January 1906).

He was fond of archaeology and numismatics. After the death of his wife, he raised two children.

== Archaeological surveys ==
While serving in the Mogilev Governorate and Minsk Governorate, and with an interest in archaeology, Turbin participated in archaeological digs in these areas. Together with K.P. Tyszkiewicz, in the 1860s, he undertook excavations in the Minsk and Igumen districts of the Minsk province, in 1870-1872.

In 1877, when he learned about the silver coin of Kiev Prince Vladimir Svyatoslavich found in Bykhovsky County (of which there are 5 known), Turbin began active excavations at the village of Obidovichi, but found nothing. Subsequently, Turbin successfully engaged in the excavation of mounds near the village of Dymovo of the Senno district on the border of the Dregovichi and Polotsk Krivichi. He discovered several burials, described them. He also undertook excavations in Turbines in Zaslavl, and was interested in brickwork in Pskov.

Its archaeological materials have not been fully published, they are stored in the State Historical Museum.

In 1866, Turbin petitioned the Ministry of Education for approval of the society of lovers of numismatics, and he became the first chairman of the Moscow Numismatic Society (1888), which was engaged in the study of coins, publication of works and the exchange of information about finds. He collected numismatic and other collections, in 1912 he participated in the International Archaeological Congress (Athens).

== Works ==
- Tips uncle // Russian invalid, 1902, No. 217
- A new device for checking the aiming and descent of the drummer // Russian invalid, 1881, No. 153
- The device device for checking aiming and descent // Russian invalid, 1881, No. 242
- A simple and cheap machine for training aiming at moving and popping targets // Russian invalid, 1895, No. 87
- About fireworks in artillery // Russian invalid, 1902, No. 235
- Schedule with young artillery soldiers // Russian invalid, 1902, No. 271

== Literature ==
- Turbin, Nikolai Matveyevich // Century of the War Ministry. 1802-1902. The memory of the members of the military council. - St. Petersburg: Printing house of M.O. Wolf, 1907. - 858 p.
- Turbin Nikolai Matveyevich // List of seniority generals: Compiled on May 1, 1901. - S. 179.
- Turbin Nikolay Matveevich // List to the generals by seniority: Compiled on September 1, 1891 - P. 360.
- Turbin Nikolai Matveevich // List to the generals by seniority: Compiled on January 1, 1891. - S. 386.
- Alekseev L.V., Bogdanov V.P. Western lands of pre-Mongol Rus in historical and archaeological interpretation. - RAS, Institute of Archeology, Moscow. state un-t them. M.V. Lomonosov, East. Fak. - M.: Nauka, 2009 .-- 336 p. - ISBN 978-5-02-036754-8
- Kakhanoўskі G. A. Archeology and History of Belarus ў XVI — XIX centuries - Mn., 1984
- Shchavelov S. Archeology, history and archival affairs of Russia in the correspondence of D. Ya. Samokvasov (1849-1911). M., Flint Science. S. 514. S. 221-222. 978-5-9765-1143-9
- Shilov D.N., Kuzmin Yu.A. Members of the State Council of the Russian Empire. 1801-1906: A Bibliographic Reference. - SPb., 2007. - ISBN 5-86007-515-4
