= Vilna Military District =

Military district of the Russian Empire

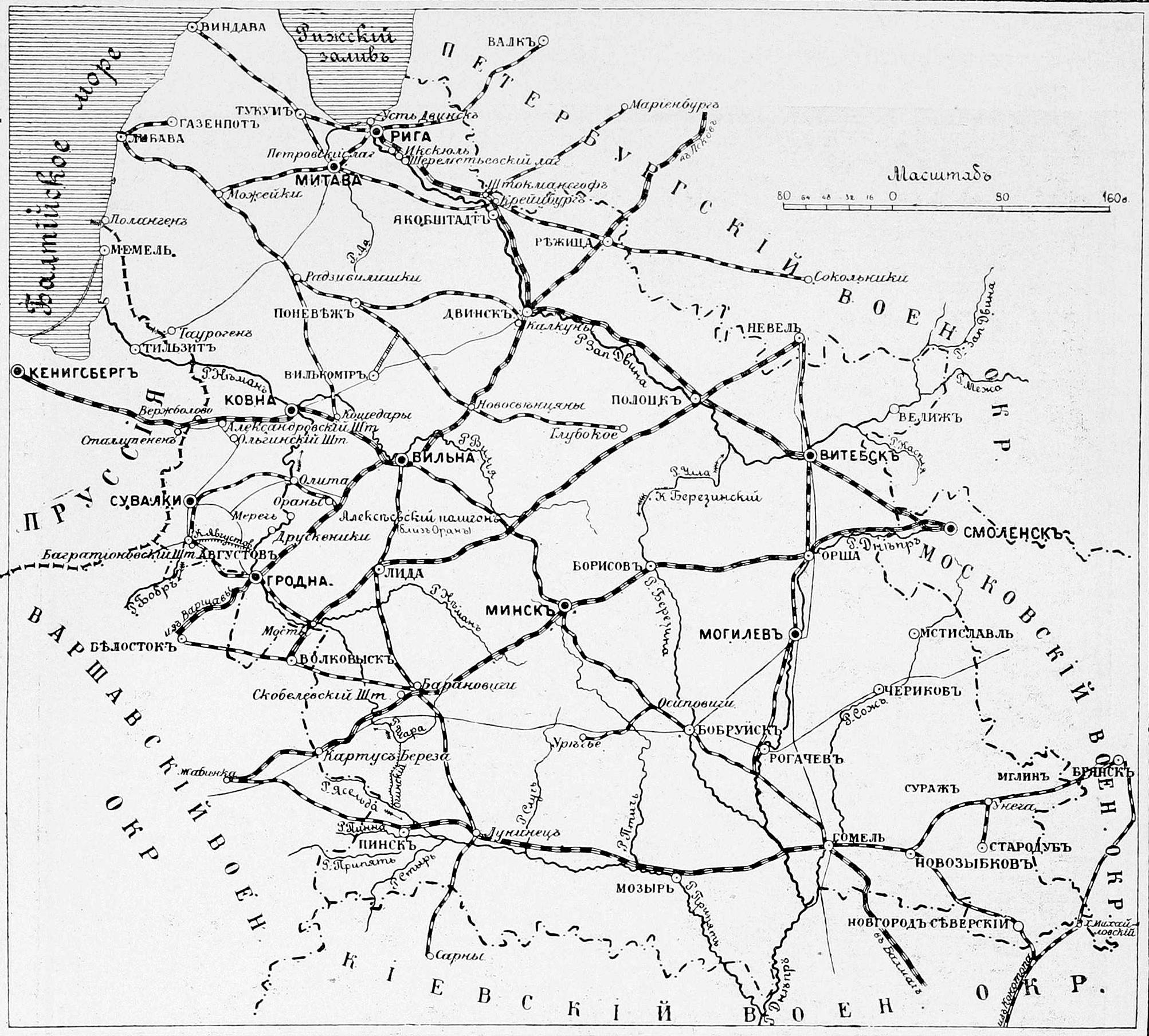
- Map of the district in 1912
- Active: 1862–1914
- Country: Russian Empire
- Branch: Imperial Russian Army
- Type: Military district
- Garrison/HQ: Vilna

Commanders
- Notable commanders: Eduard Totleben; Oskar Grippenberg; Sergei Gershelman; Paul von Rennenkampf

Vilna Military District (Russian: Ви́ленский вое́нный о́круг) was a military district of the Imperial Russian Army. The district was formed in 1862 as part of Russian military reforms and was responsible for parts of modern Belarus, Latvia, Lithuania, and Poland. The district was disbanded at the beginning of the First World War in July 1914, and its headquarters were used to form another district farther to the rear.

== History ==
In the Russian Empire, military districts were first formed by Dmitry Milyutin in 1862–64 to replace the pre-existing Military Inspectorates. The military districts were organised to include civilian administration regions of gubernyas and uyezds. The Vilna Military District was created on 6 July 1862. The district headquarters were in Vilna (now Vilnius, Lithuania), and were formed from the headquarters of the 1st Army Corps, which it replaced. In 1864, the district opened the Vilna Junker Infantry School to prepare non-commissioned officers.

In 1870, it had the second highest concentration of troops in the military district system after the Warsaw Military District, with 78,180 men. By 1871, the district's troops had been reduced to seven infantry divisions, a cavalry brigade, a demining brigade and four reserve battalions, an organization proposed in 1864. The district commander often simultaneously held the position of Governor-General of Vilna.

On 17 July 1914, just before the beginning of the First World War, martial law was imposed in the district. After the outbreak of the war later that month, the district headquarters became the headquarters of the new Dvinsk Military District. Combat units stationed in the district at the time became part of the new 1st Army, under the command of district commander Paul von Rennenkampf.

== Area covered ==
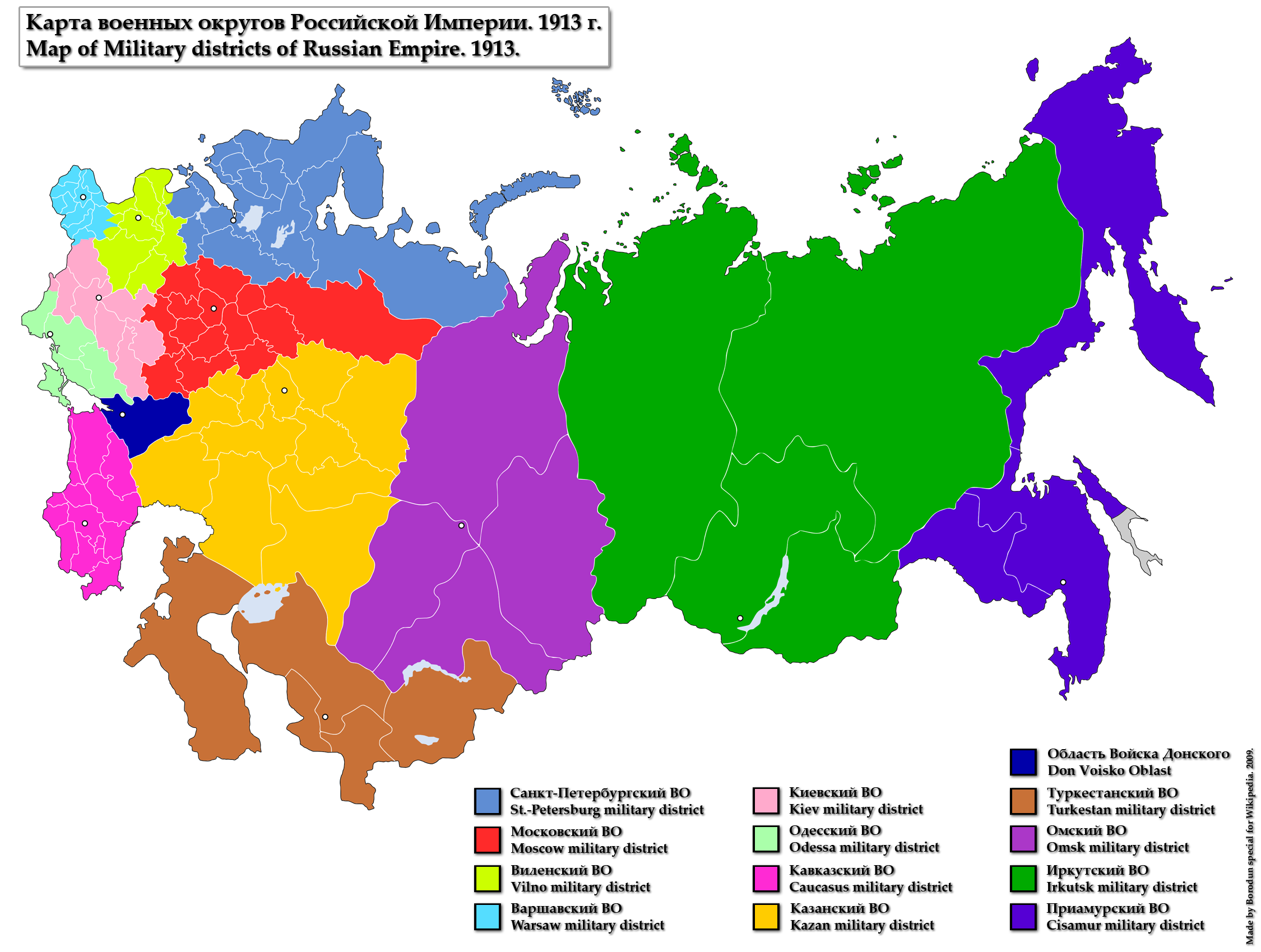
Military Districts of the Russian Empire, 1913

The Vilna Military District comprised the following gubernyas:

- Vilna
- Grodno
- Kovno
- Courland
- Livonia (excluding the Pernov, Fellinskiy, Valkskiy and Verrosskiy uyezds)
- Vitebsk
- Mogilev
- Minsk
- Suwałki (excluding Shchuchinsk uyezd)

== Military units ==
The following units were based in the Vilna Military District upon the outbreak of the First World War in 1914:

- 2nd Army Corps
  - 26th Infantry Division
  - 43rd Infantry Division
  - 2nd Cavalry Division
- 3rd Army Corps
  - 25th Infantry Division
  - 27th Infantry Division
  - 3rd Cavalry Division
- 4th Army Corps
  - 30th Infantry Division
  - 40th Infantry Division
- 20th Army Corps
  - 28th Infantry Division
  - 29th Infantry Division

== Commanders ==
The district was commanded by the following officers:

- Lieutenant General and Adjutant General Vladimir Nazimov (6 July 1862 – 1 May 1863)
- General of Infantry Mikhail Nikolaevich Muravyov (May 1863 - April 1865)
- Adjutant General, Engineer General Konstantin Petrovich von Kaufmann (17 April 1865 - October 1866)
- Adjutant General, Lieutenant General Eduard Trofimovich Baranov (9 October 1866 -2 March 1868)
- Adjutant General, Lieutenant General Alexander Lvovich Potapov (28 February 1868 - July 1874)
- Lieutenant General (Promoted to General of cavalry April 1878) Pyotr Albedinsky (22 July 1874 – 18 May 1880)
- General of engineers Eduard Totleben (18 May 1880 – 19 June 1884)
- General of infantry Alexander Nikitin (23 September 1884 – 11 March 1886)
- General of infantry Nikolay Ganetsky (13 March 1886 – 11 February 1895)
- General of infantry and Adjutant General Vitaly Trotsky (1897–1901)
- General of infantry Alexander Gurchin (1901–1902)
- General of infantry Oskar Grippenberg (10 November 1902 – 11 September 1904)
- General of infantry Alexander Freze (12 October 1904 – 19 December 1905)
- Lieutenant General (Promoted to General of infantry 1906) Konstantin Krzhivitsky (1905–1909)
- Lieutenant General (Promoted to General of infantry 1910) Sergei Gershelman (17 March 1909 – 17 November 1910, died of illness)
- Lieutenant General (Promoted to General of infantry 6 December 1910) Fyodor Martson (23 November 1910 – 17 January 1913)
- General of cavalry and Adjutant General Paul von Rennenkampff (20 January 1913 – 19 July 1914)

== Commanders of the Dvinsk Military District ==
- General of Infantry Alexei Evgrafovich Churin (19 July - 30 August 1914)
- Engineer-general Prince Nikolai Evseevich Tumanov (30 August 1914 - 14 September 1915)
- Infantry General Dmitry Petrovich Zuyev (16 September 1915 - 25 April 1917)
