= Governor-General of Baltic provinces =

Military commander in Baltic states until 19th century

The governor-general of the Baltic provinces or governor-general of Estonia, Livonia, and Courland (Russian: Генерал-губернатор Прибалтийского края) was the military commander of the Riga Military District and the highest administrator of the Baltic governorates of Estonia, Livonia and Courland sporadically under Russian rule in the 19th century.

== List of Russian governors-general of the Baltic provinces ==
=== Governors-general of Riga ===
- Anikita Repnin (1710–1726) appointed by Peter I of Russia
- Peter Lacy (1729-1740)

=== Governors-general of Livonia ===
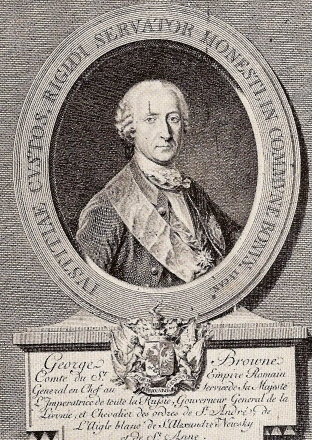
George Brown as the Governor-General of Livonia

- Vladimir Petrovich Dolgorukiy (1758–1761)
- George Browne (1762–1791)
- Nicholas Repnin (1792–1796) as the Governor-General of Livonia and Estonia

=== Governors-general of Livonia, Estonia and Courland in Riga ===
- Peter Ludwig von der Pahlen (1800–1801) Governor-General of Courland since 1795
- Sergei Fyodorovich Golitsyn (ru) (1801–1803)
- Friedrich Wilhelm von Buxhoeveden (1803–1807),
- Alexander Tormasov (1807)
- Friedrich Wilhelm von Buxhoeveden (1808–1810) as the Governor-General of Livonia and Courland
- Dmitry Ivanovich Lobanov-Rostovsky (1810–1812)
- Filippo Paulucci (1812–1830)
- Carl Magnus von der Pahlen (ru) (1830–1845)
- Yevgeny Golovin (1845–1848)
- Alexander Arkadyevich Suvorov (1848–1861)
- Wilhelm Heinrich von Lieven (ru) (1861–1864)
- Pyotr Andreyevich Shuvalov (1864–1866)
- Johann Eduard von Baranoff (ru) (1866)
- Peter Albedinskiy (ru) (1866–1870)
- Peter Bagrationi (1870–1876)

=== Governors-general appointed during martial law ===
- Vasily Ustinovich Sollogub (ru) (1905–1906)
- Alexander Nikolaevich Meller-Zakomelsky (1906–1909)

== See also ==
- Governors-General of Swedish Livonia
- List of rulers of Estonia
