= 198th Alexander Nevsky Infantry Regiment =

- 198-й Александро-Невский пехотный полк
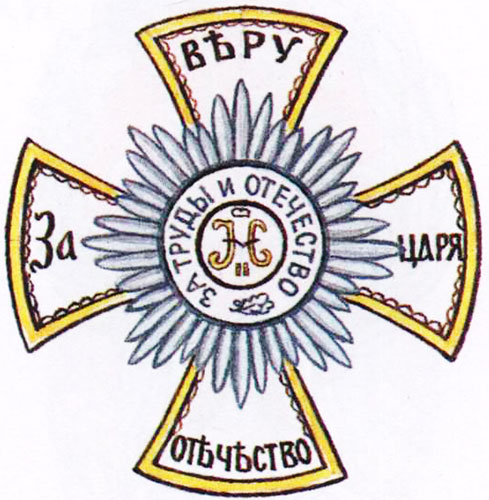
- Active: 1811 – c. 1917
- Country: Russian Empire
- Branch: Russian Imperial Army
- Role: Infantry
- Garrison/HQ: St Petersburg (to 1910); Vologda (to 1914)
- Patron: Alexander Nevsky
- Anniversaries: August 30
- Engagements: World War I; Battle of Łódź; Battle of the Vistula River; Brusilov Offensive

The 198th Alexander Nevsky Infantry Regiment (Russian: 198-й Александро-Невский пехотный полк) was an infantry regiment of the Russian Imperial Army that existed from 1811 until the end of World War I and the Russian Revolution. It was named after the medieval Kievan Rus' prince and military leader Alexander Nevsky.

== History ==
It was formed originally on 17 January 1811 in St Petersburg as a battalion and was given various names before being named for Alexander Nevsky on 25 March 1891, as the Alexander Nevsky Infantry Reserve Battalion. On 3 January 1899 it was expanded to the status of a regiment, becoming known as the Alexander Nevsky Reserve Infantry Regiment, and on 20 February 1910 it was completely reformed, being transferred from the reserve to active duty. The unit was combined with the 246th Reserve Infantry Gryazovetsky Battalion, stationed in Vologda, and the Arkhangelsk Reserve Battalion, becoming designated as the 198th Alexander Nevsky Infantry Regiment. While stationed in the city of Vologda from 1910 on, the unit took part in the parade there during the celebrations of the 300th anniversary of the Romanov dynasty and the 100th anniversary of the victory during the Patriotic War of 1812.

When World War I broke out in 1914, the 198th Infantry Regiment was stationed in Vologda, part of the 50th Infantry Division of the 22nd Army Corps, which was headquartered in St Petersburg. It fought in the Battle of Łódź early on in the war and later took part in the fighting near Warsaw during Battle of the Vistula River. In 1916 the regiment fought in the Brusilov Offensive on the Southwestern Front against Austria-Hungary. During that time the regiment was part of the 1st Army, 2nd Army, and 4th Army.

== Insignia ==
The regiment had a banner that dated back to 1800, which earlier belonged to Count Liven's 1st Regiment of the Moscow Inspectorate. In 1913 it was given a new insignia which included a cross. It was one of the four Russian regiments that went to war in 1914 with its banner, which dated back to the times of Paul I.

== Regimental church ==
The church of the 198th Alexander Nevsky Infantry Regiment was founded in 1897. From 1910 the church was located in the city of Vologda on the shore of river with the same name. It had enough space for 500 people.

== Known commanders ==
Includes commanders of the earlier Alexander Nevsky Reserve Infantry Battalion.

	Name	From	To
1	Colonel Otto von Talberg	8 October 1864	19 December 1866
2	Colonel Vladimir Novikov	?	9 February 1898
3	Colonel Wilhelm Malm	31 December 1906	11 June 1910
4	Colonel Ivan Petrovich	10 August 1910	1914
5	Colonel Konstantin Volkenau	29 December 1914	2 December 1916
6	Colonel Nikolai Maximov	2 December 1916	24 February 1917
