= Ivan Nadarov =

Ivan Pavlovich Nadarov
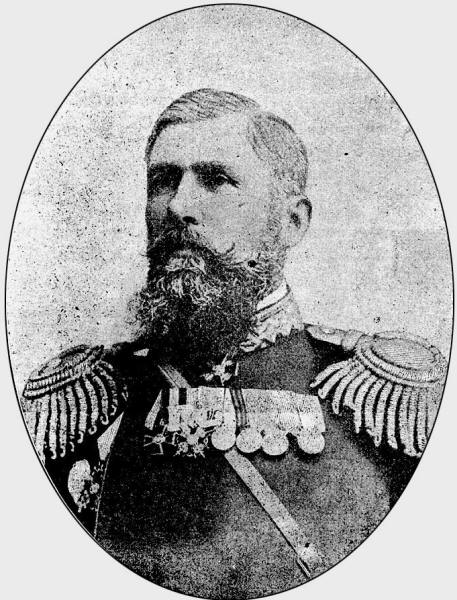
- Born: January 3 (15), 1851; Konstantinograd, Russian Empire
- Died: 1922
- Military career
- Allegiance: Russian Empire
- Branch: Imperial Russian Army
- Rank: general
- Unit: 29th Infantry Division (Russian Empire)

Ivan Pavlovich Nadarov (January 3 (15), 1851 – 1922) - Russian military leader, infantry general, writer, one of the pioneers of the Ussuri Territory.

== Biography ==
Born in 1851 in Konstantinograd, from Poltava noblemen. By nationality - Circassian. He graduated from the Poltava Cadet Corps (1867), the second Konstantinovsky Military School and the Academy of the General Staff (1878). He began his service in the Life Guards Jaeger Regiment. Officer since June 12, 1869. From 1869 to 1871 he was retired. He took part in the Russo-Turkish War (1877-78).

In the summer of 1882 he was sent for reconnaissance of the military road along the Chinese border, performed related ethnographic, geographical and linguistic studies. He investigated and put on the map the rivers Vak, Bikin, Bolshaya Ussurka, Daubikha. It was he who first investigated the life and life of the indigenous population of the Primorsky region - the Udege. He also recorded 238 words of the Ussuri Udege, the first dictionary of a previously unknown language. He has been an active figure in the Society for the Study of the Amur Region (OIAK) in Vladivostok since 1884, from the very foundation of the Society. In 1885 became a lifetime member of the OIAK.

In 1887, with the rank of colonel, he was appointed head of the fortress headquarters of the Vladivostok fortress. Chief of Staff of the 29th Infantry Division (May 16, 1889 - December 29, 1896), commander of the 122nd Infantry Tambov Regiment (December 29, 1896 - June 23, 1897). In 1898 - the district quartermaster of the Amur Military District. From 1898 to 1901 he was chairman of the Amur department of the Imperial Russian Geographical Society. In 1900-1901 he participated in a military campaign in northern Manchuria.

On May 9, 1901, he was appointed military governor of the Transbaikal Region, commander of the troops in it and the chief ataman of the Transbaikal Cossack Army. During the Russo-Japanese War, the chief of the military-district directorate of the Manchurian Army (April 12, 1904 - February 23, 1905) and the main rear chief of the Manchurian armies (February 23, 1905 - April 25, 1906).

From April 25, 1906, to June 8, 1908, the Steppe Governor-General, commander of the Omsk Military District and the ataman of the Siberian Cossack Army. June 8, 1908 he was promoted to general from infantry with dismissal from service with a uniform and pension.

The retired general spent the end of his life in his native Konstantinograd. The date and circumstances of Nadarov's death are still unknown. It was previously believed that he was shot by the Reds in 1920. However, recent studies have clearly established that Ivan Pavlovich lived until 1922. After his death, daughter Olga and her family moved to Petersburg; unfortunately, the general's archive was subsequently destroyed due to the threat of reprisals.

== Ranks ==
Joined the service (August 19, 1867), second lieutenant (art. 12.07, 1869), lieutenant for contrasting with art. 2.01, 1873, staff captain (art. April 26, 1877), captain (art. January 6, 1878), renamed the headquarters captains of the General Staff (April 25, 1878), captain (art. April 20, 1880), lieutenant colonel (Art.April 17, 1883), Colonel for contrasting with Art. 04/05, 1887, Major General for contrast with Art. December 6, 1897, lieutenant general for contrast with Art. January 31, 1901. Retired with the production of generals from infantry (06/08, 1908).

== Awards ==
- Order of St. Stanislav 3 degrees with swords (1879)
- Order of St. Anna 3 degrees (1880)
- Order of St. Stanislav 2 degrees (1885)
- Order of St. Anna 2 degrees (1891)
- Order of St. Vladimir 4 degrees (1895)
- Order of St. Vladimir 3 degrees (1901)
- Order of St. Stanislav 1 degree (1904)
- Order of St. Anna 1 degree (1905)
- Order of St. Vladimir 2 degrees (1906)
- silver medal named after N.M. Przhevalsky of the Russian Geographical Society (1886)
- small gold medal of the Russian Geographical Society (1889)

== Reviews about him ==
Ivan Pavlovich - that was the name of Nadarov - was the original. Small stature, broad-shouldered, walked overloading. The voice was bass. His cap, with the longest visor, was known throughout Khabarovsk. Nadarov, like General Selivanov, although he was severe in appearance, he was a kind person in his heart, why his subordinates loved and appreciated him very much.

    - Vereshchagin A.V. According to Manchuria. 1900-1901 Memories and Stories

Military offices
Preceded by	Chief of Staff of the 29th Infantry Division; 1889-1896	Succeeded by

== Sources ==
- Pavlovsky, Ivan Frantsevich. Poltava: Hierarchs, statesmen and public figures and benefactors. Poltava: Printed. Cases (typ. Ex. Dohman), 1914.
- Nadarov Ivan Pavlovich // Biographical Dictionary (Russian). - 2000.
- Nadarov, Ivan Pavlovich. site "History of Poltava". Date of treatment July 30, 2013.
- History of the Siberian Military District / Acad. military man. sciences, Sib. Separation [comp .: A. A. Soloviev and others; under the editorship of President Sib. Acad. military man. Major General A. Leontyev; rec. - deputy. before Ohm. Dep. Rus Geo islands, prof. *Novikov F.I.]. - Omsk: [b. and.], 2002 (Printing house of OTII). - 51 p.; 20 cm. - Bibliography: p. 50.
- Ivan Pavlovich Nadarov. // Avilov R.S., Ayushin N. B., Kalinin V.I. Vladivostok fortress: troops, fortification, events, people. Part I. "To spite the arrogant neighbor." 1860–1905 Vladivostok: Dalnauka, 2013 .-- S. 337–351.
- Turmov G.P., Kalinin V.I., Ayushin N.B., Avilov R.S. In the footsteps of an old photograph: the Nadarov family. // Russia and Asia-Pacific. - 2015. - No. 1 - P. 94–126.
