= 32nd Infantry Division (Russian Empire) =

- 32-я пехотная дивизия
- Active: 1914–1918
- Country: Russian Empire
- Branch: Russian Imperial Army
- Role: Infantry

The 32nd Infantry Division (Russian: 32-я пехо́тная диви́зия, 32-ya Pekhotnaya Diviziya) was an infantry formation of the Russian Imperial Army. It was part of the 11th Army Corps.

== Organization ==
- 1st Brigade
  - 125th Infantry Regiment Kursky
  - 126th Infantry Regiment Rylsky
- 2nd Brigade
  - 127th Infantry Regiment Putivlsky
  - 128th Infantry Regiment Starooskolsky
- 32nd Artillery Brigade

== Commanders ==
- 1896-1897: Georgy Tumanov

== Chiefs of Staff ==
- 1891-1896: Nikolai Ruzsky
- 1896-1898: Alexander Ragoza

== Commanders of the 1st Brigade ==
- 1873: M.F. Petrushevkiy
- 1916: Vladimir Cheremisov

== Commanders of the 2nd Brigade ==
- April 30 - June 30, 1878: Nikolay Dmitrievich Tatischev

== Artillery Brigade Commanders ==
- 1911-1914: Mikhail Promtov
