= 50th Infantry Division (Russian Empire) =

- 50-я пехотная дивизия
- Active: 1863–1918
- Country: Russian Empire
- Branch: Russian Imperial Army
- Role: Infantry

The 50th Infantry Division (Russian: 50-я пехотная дивизия, 50-ya Pekhotnaya Diviziya) was an infantry formation of the Russian Imperial Army. Its headquarters was located at Saint Petersburg.

== Organization ==
It was part of the 18th Army Corps.

- 1st Brigade
  - 197th Lesnoi Infantry Regiment
  - 198th Alexander Nevsky Infantry Regiment
- 2nd Brigade
  - 199th Kronstadt Infantry Regiment
  - 200th Kronshlotsky Infantry Regiment
- 50th Artillery Brigade
