= 18th Army Corps (Russian Empire) =

- Country: Russian Empire
- Allegiance: Imperial Russian Army
- Engagements: First World War; Eastern Front; Battle of the Vistula River

The 18th Army Corps was an Army corps in the Imperial Russian Army. Its headquarters were located in Saint Petersburg.

== Composition ==
In July 1914:

- 23rd Infantry Division
- 37th Infantry Division
- 50th Infantry Division
- 18th Howitzer Artillery Battalion
- 18th Sapper Battalion

== Part of ==
- 9th Army: 1 August 1914 – 2 February 1915
- 11th Army: 20 April 1915 – 21 May 1916
- 7th Army: 20 June – 17 July 1916
- 8th Army: 1 October 1916 – 16 June 1917
- 9th Army: 19 August 1917 – December 1917

== Commanders ==
- Ivan Makarovich Orbeliani: 1905 – 1906
- Platon Lechitsky: 1908 – 1910
- Andrei Zayonchkovski: 1916 – 1917
- Ivan Erdieli: 1917
