= Nikolay Tatischev =

Russian army officer (1829–1904)

Nikolay Dmitrievich Tatischev
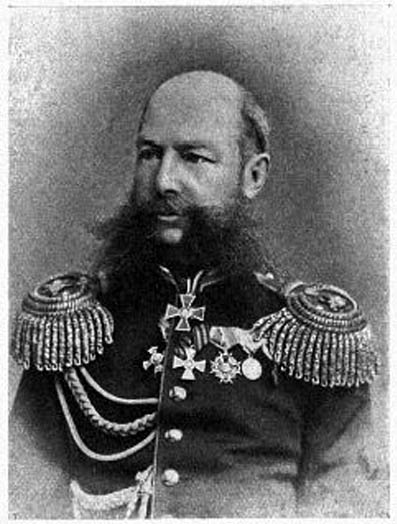
- Born: February 15, 1829; St. Petersburg, Russian Empire
- Died: September 16, 1907 (aged 78)
- Relatives: Tatishchev family
- Military career
- Allegiance: Russian Empire
- Branch: Imperial Russian Army
- Rank: general
- Commands: 29th Infantry Division (Russian Empire)
- Conflicts: Russo-Turkish War

Nikolay Dmitrievich Tatischev (February 15, 1829 – September 16, 1907) was an infantry general, and hero of the Russo-Turkish War.

== Early life ==
Born February 15, 1829, in Saint Petersburg, to Count Dmitry Nikolayevich Tatishchev (1796–1851) and Serafima Ivanovna (née Kusova) (1807–1869).

== Military service ==
He was educated at the School of Guard Ensigns and Cavalry Junkers.

On August 14, 1847, he was released as ensign in the Life Guards Preobrazhensky Regiment.

In 1849, (on the occasion of the war with Hungary) he was on a march of guards to the western borders of the Russian Empire and on December 6 of that year was promoted to second lieutenant.

During the Crimean War, Tatishchev was part of the troops guarding the coast of the Gulf of Finland near Vyborg.

In March 27, 1855, he was promoted to headquarters captain and April 23, was appointed company commander in the Preobrazhensky regiment. On December 6, 1859, he was appointed adjutant wing and on March 14, 1862, he was enrolled in the retinue of His Majesty with deduction from the regiment, on April 17 of the same year he was promoted to captain.

On April 16, 1866, he was promoted to colonel. On October 14, 1869, he was appointed commander of the 9th Infantry Staroingermanlandsky regiment. In 1877, Tatishchev with his regiment was in Bulgaria and took part in the war with Turkey. He fought near Plevna on the Grivitsky redoubt, then was on reconnaissance of passages through the Balkans and distinguished himself in the detachment of General Kartsov in capturing the Troyan pass from the battle. For the difference when crossing the Balkans Tatishchev March 5, 1878 was awarded the Order of St. George 4th degree "While taking possession of the Trojan pass, December 26, 1877, commanding the 9th infantry Staroingermanlandsky regiment, led a frontal attack on the enemy's fortified position and took control of the main redoubt and gun, with insignificant losses for us".

After crossing the Balkans, Tatishchev reached Adrianople and from there went to the Aegean Sea at Alexandroupolis. Then he carried out a reconnaissance along the seashore to Gallipoli.

On January 1, 1878, for the difference in cases against the Turks, Tatishchev was promoted to major general with admission to the Suite and appointment from March 1 to the disposal of the Commander-in-Chief of the acting army, Grand Duke Nikolai Nikolaevich the Elder. In January–February, he temporarily commanded the 1st Brigade of the 3rd Infantry Division. On March 17, 1878, he was awarded a golden saber with the inscription "For courage". For Plevna, on June 3, 1879, he was awarded the Order of St. Stanislav 1st degree with swords.

On April 30, 1878, Tatishchev was appointed commander of the 2nd Brigade of the 32nd Infantry Division (Russian Empire), but on June 30, due to his illness, he was expelled from the post of brigade commander, leaving His Majesty in the retinue. Tatishchev remained without a post until April 28, 1881, when he was given command of the 2nd Brigade of the 1st Grenadier Division (Russian Empire).

On August 30, 1890, Tatishchev was promoted to lieutenant general and appointed head of the 29th Infantry Division, and on January 17, 1896, he received the rank of general from infantry and resigned.

He died on September 16, 1907, aged 78.

== Awards ==
- Order of St. Stanislav 3rd degree (August 26, 1856)
- Order of St. Vladimir 4th degree (August 3, 1869)
- Order of St. Anna, 2nd degree (March 27, 1872)
- Order of St. Vladimir 3rd degree (February 23, 1875)
- Order of St. George 4th degree (March 5, 1878)
- Golden saber with the inscription "For courage" (March 17, 1878)
- Order of St. Stanislav 1st degree with swords (June 3, 1879)
- Order of St. Anna 1st degree (August 30, 1882)
- Order of St. Vladimir, 2nd degree (August 30, 1886)
- Order of the White Eagle (January 17, 1896, upon retirement)

Military offices
Preceded by	Commander of the 29th Infantry Division; 1890-1896	Succeeded by

== Sources ==
- Volkov S.V. Generality of the Russian Empire. Encyclopedic dictionary of generals and admirals from Peter I to Nicholas II. T. II. – M., 2009
- Ismailov E.E. Golden weapon with the inscription "For courage". Lists of gentlemen 1788–1913. – M., 2007
- Mrochkovsky K.I. A brief history of the 9th Infantry Staroingermanlandsky regiment. For the lower ranks. 1703–1892 – M., 1892
- Gr. Tatishchev Nikolay Dmitrievich // List to generals by seniority. Done on September 1. – SPb., 1891. – S. 389.
- Starchevsky A. A. Monument of the Eastern War of 1877–1878 – SPb., 1878
- Tatishchev S. S. Rod Tatishchev. 1400–1900. Historical and genealogical research. – SPb., 1900
- Schenk V.K. History of the sovereign retinue. The reign of Alexander II. – SPb., 1914
- Shilov D.N., Kuzmin Yu.A. Members of the State Council of the Russian Empire. 1801–1906: A Bibliographic Reference. – SPb., 2007
