= Alexander Alekseyevich Svechin =

Imperial Russian Army general

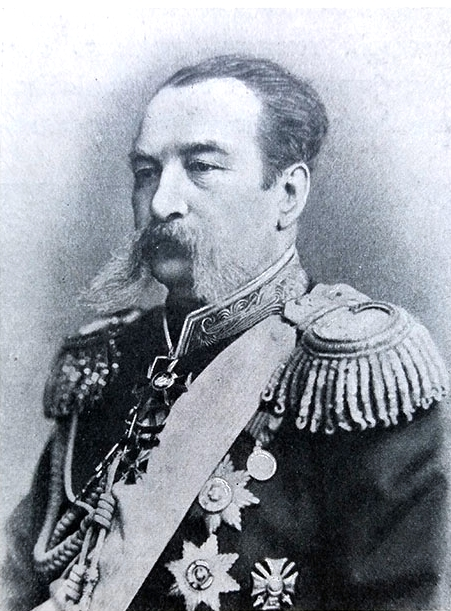
- Born: December 17, 1823
- Died: March 8, 1896; Saint Petersburg, Russian Empire
- Allegiance: Russian Empire
- Service / branch: Imperial Russian Army
- Rank: general
- Commands: 29th Infantry Division (Russian Empire)

Alexander Alekseyevich Svechin (December 17, 1823 – March 8, 1896) - adjutant general (1880), infantry general (1886) of the Russian imperial army.

== Biography ==
Born in the family of Lieutenant General Alexei Alexandrovich Svechin from his marriage with the daughter of Colonel, the favorite of Suvorov, Fedosya Petrovna Koritskaya. On August 8, 1842, after graduating from the School of Guard Ensigns and Cavalry Junkers, he was promoted to officer. In 1849 he took part in the campaign of the guard to the western borders of the empire. In 1854, he was part of the troops guarding the coasts of the St. Petersburg province from the British-French landings.

In 1857 he was promoted to colonel of the guard and retired. In 1859 he was again accepted for service, was the head officer for special assignments under the commander in chief of the Caucasian Army. Since 1861, the commander of the 14th Grenadier of Georgia, His Imperial Highness Grand Duke Konstantin Nikolayevich regiment. On October 1, 1863, "in retaliation for the excellent courage shown in dealing with the highlanders during the expedition of the Adagum detachment in 1862," he was granted the Order of St. Vladimir of the 4th degree with swords and bows. In 1864 he was promoted to major general. Since 1865, the assistant chief of the Caucasus Grenadier Division (Russian Empire). Since 1868 he was appointed head of the 38th Infantry Division (Russian Empire). Since 1869, he was appointed head of the 29th Infantry Division. In 1872 he was promoted to lieutenant general. Since 1878, the head of the 1st Grenadier Division (Russian Empire). In 1880 he was appointed adjutant general. Since 1879, the commander of the 10th Army Corps (Russian Empire). In 1886 he was promoted to general from infantry. Since 1889, he was appointed a member of the Alexander Committee on the Wounded.

He died of pneumonia in 1896 in St. Petersburg, was buried in the chapel of the Church of the Intercession of the Virgin in the village of Tupichev, Chernihiv province.

== Family ==
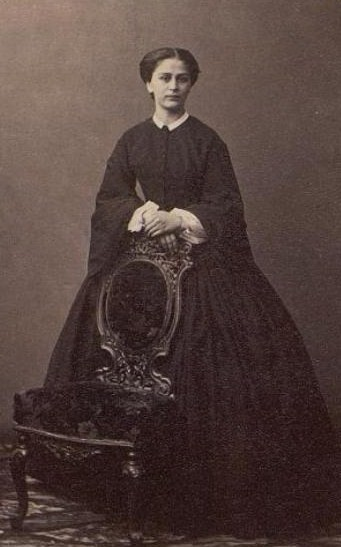
Svechin's wife, Lyubov Sergeyevna Svechina

Wife (from February 21, 1864) - Princess Lyubov Sergeyevna Golitsyna (October 27, 1841 - 02.06, 1910), maid of honor of Grand Duchess Olga Fedorovna (01.21.1861), daughter of Prince S.P. Golitsyn and granddaughter of Count P.I. Apraksin. The wedding was in Tiflis, guarantors for the groom were A. P. Kartsov and Prince A. V. Trubetskoy; on the bride - Count V.V. Levashov and D.A. Filosofov. According to V. A. Insarsky, “the meek, affectionate, charming Princess Golitsyna was the ideal of a Russian girl and positively captivated those around her. Grand Duke Mikhail Nikolayevich graciously threatened the princess with marriage and jokingly said: “Wait, as soon as we eat in the Caucasus, I will give you married now!” And really humorous and sweet foreshortening came true. Soon the news spread around Petersburg that the princess married and for whom - to Svechin, for whose narrow-mindedness and pomp that vanity was glorified throughout the Caucasus. This husband, if he had not been very rich, he could hardly have captivated the heart of any girl with his personal qualities. Svechin was a terrible egoist and painfully conceited. He was not carried away by the dignity of the princess, but, perhaps through her, became close to the court of the Grand Duke and improved his political position. ” Died of uremia in Lausanne, buried there in the Montois cemetery. Their kids:

- Love (1865-1935), maid of honor, married to Lieutenant General I. N. Svechin.
- Alexey (1865-1924), twin with sister, colonel.
- Vera (1868—?), Was the wife of the Moscow mayor E.N. Volkov.

== Awards ==
- Order of St. Anna, 3rd degree (1853)
- Order of St. Stanislav 2nd degree (1856)
- Order of St. Anna, 2nd degree with the Imperial crown and swords (1859)
- Golden weapon “For courage” (1861)
- Order of St. Vladimir 4th degree with swords and bow (1863)
- Order of St. Vladimir 3rd degree (1867)
- Order of St. Stanislav 1st degree (1869)
- Order of St. Anna 1st degree (1871)
- Order of St. Vladimir, 2nd degree (1875)
- Order of the White Eagle (1878)
- Order of St. Alexander Nevsky (1883; diamond signs - 1890)

Military offices
Preceded by	Commander of the 29th Infantry Division; 1869-1878	Succeeded by

== Literature ==
- Volkov S.V. Generality of the Russian Empire: Encyclopedic Dictionary of Generals and Admirals from Peter I to Nicholas II: in 2 volumes. - M .: Tsentrpoligraf, 2009. - T. 2: L — I. - S. 690. - ISBN 978-5-227-02055-0 .;
- Ismailov E.E. “Golden weapon with the inscription“ For courage ”. Lists of gentlemen 1788-1913. " - M., 2007. - S.P. 256, 504. - ISBN 978-5-903473-05-2;
- Ponomarev V. P., Shabanov V. M. “Cavaliers of the Imperial Order of St. Alexander Nevsky, 1725-1917”: a bio-bibliographic dictionary in three volumes. Volume 3. - M., 2009. - S. 315–316. - ISBN 978-5-89577-145-7

== Sources ==
- "Свечин Александр Алексеевич". Список генералам по старшинству. Составлен по 1-е мая 1893 года. СПб.: Военная типография. 1893. p. 47.
- "Свечин Александр Алексеевич // Биографический словарь". Высшие чины Российской Империи (22.10.1721—2.03.1917). Vol. 3. Москва: [сост. Е. Л. Потёмкин] типография. 2017.
