= Yevgeny Golovin =

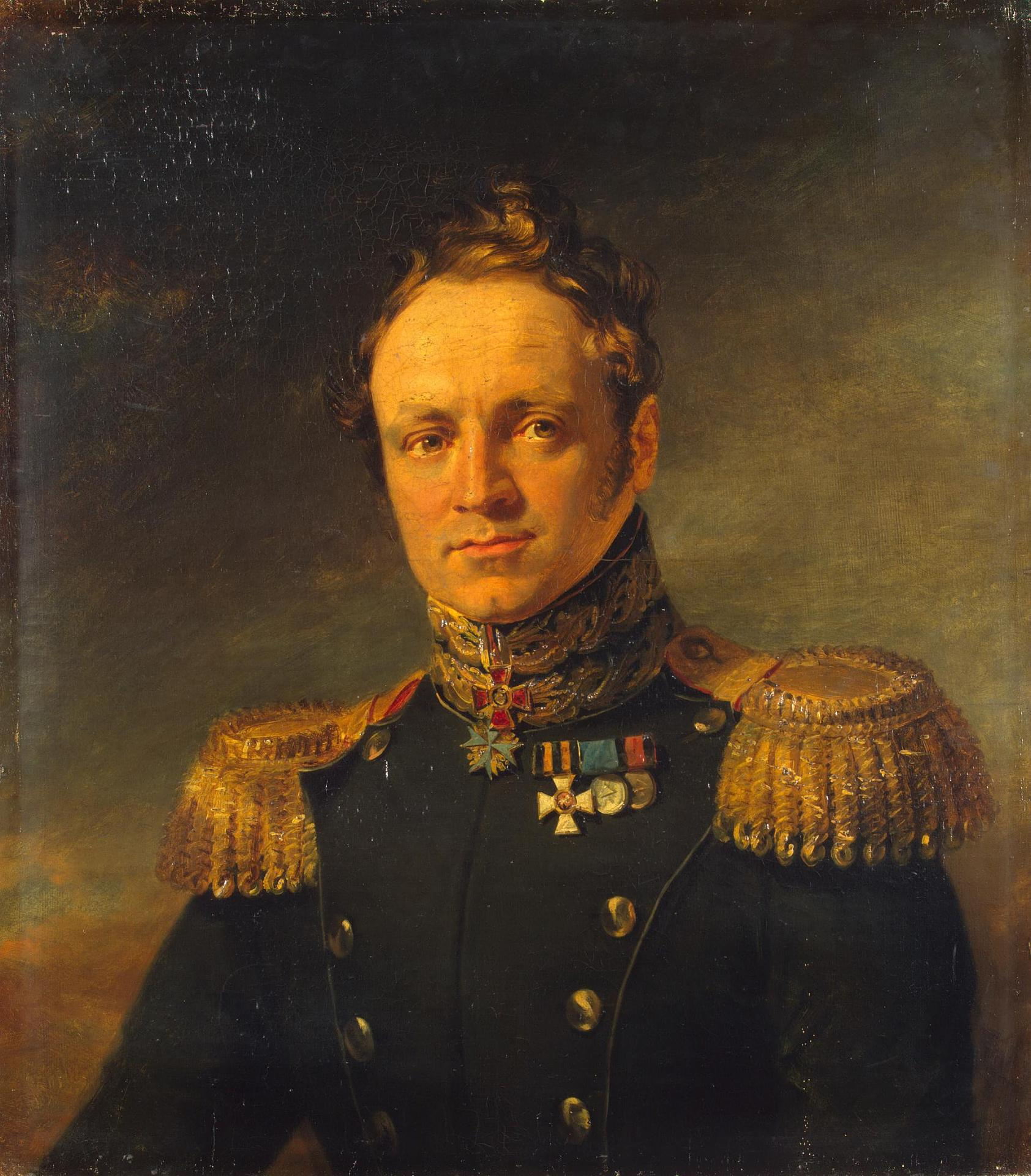
- Born: 1 May 1782; Moscow Governorate
- Died: 27 June 1858 (aged 76); Smolensk Governorate
- Education: Imperial Moscow University (1797)
- Occupation: General

Yevgeny Aleksandrovich Golovin (Russian: Евге́ний Алекса́ндрович Голови́н; 1 May 1782 – 27 June 1858) was a general in the Imperial Russian Army. In 1811 was appointed commander of Fanagoriyskaya Regiment and steadily rose through the ranks until he was promoted to General of Infantry in 1839. He was also Commander-in-Chief in the Caucasus from 1838 to 1842 and Governor-General of Baltic provinces from 1845 to 1848.

== Bibliography ==
- A. Andreev; D. Tsygankov (2010). Imperial Moscow University: 1755-1917: encyclopedic dictionary. Moscow: Russian political encyclopedia (ROSSPEN). pp. 173–174. ISBN 978-5-8243-1429-8.
