= 23rd Infantry Division (Russian Empire) =

- 23-я пехотная дивизия
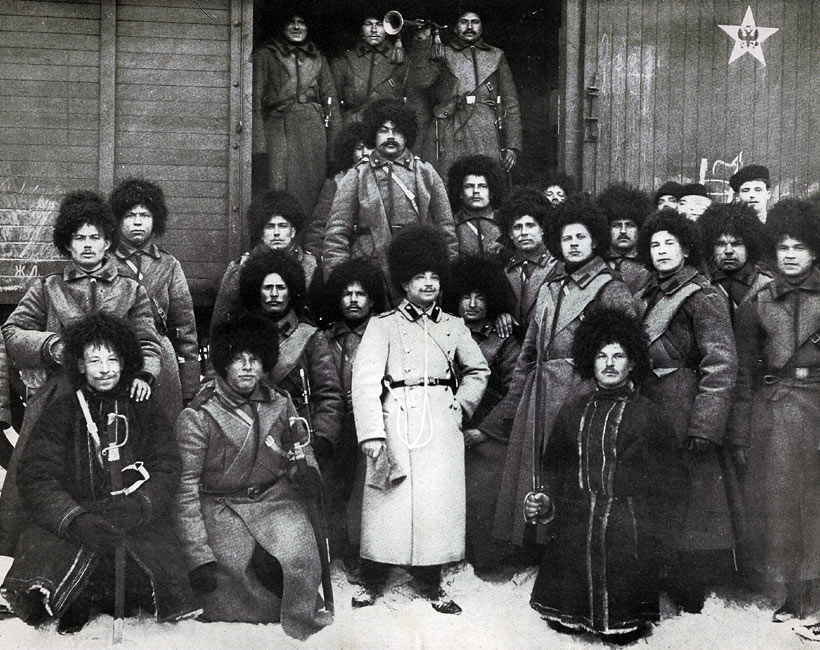
- Active: 1914–1918
- Country: Russian Empire
- Branch: Russian Imperial Army
- Role: Infantry

The 23rd Infantry Division (Russian: 23-я пехотная дивизия, 23-ya pekhotnaya diviziya) was an infantry formation of the Russian Imperial Army. Its headquarters was located at Tallinn (Reval).

== Organization ==
It was part of the 18th Army Corps.

- 1st Brigade
  - 89th Infantry Regiment
  - 90th Infantry Regiment
- 2nd Brigade
  - 91st Infantry Regiment
  - 92nd Infantry Regiment
- 23rd Artillery Brigade

== Commanders ==
- 1888-1893: Mikhail Batyanov
- 1894-1897: Richard Troyanovich Meves
