= Richard Troyanovich Meves =

Russian general

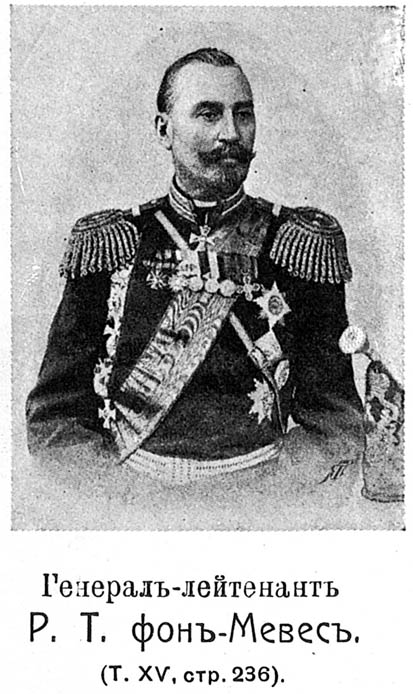
- Richard Troyanovich Meves
- Born: 1839
- Died: 1901 (aged 61–62)
- Allegiance: Russian Empire
- Branch: Imperial Russian Army
- Commands: 23rd Infantry Division (Russian Empire); 20th Army Corps (Russian Empire)
- Conflicts: January Uprising; Russo-Turkish War

Richard Troyanovich Meves (Russian: Ричард Троянович фон Мевес) (1839–1901) was a Lieutenant general in the Imperial Russian Army who fought in the Russo-Turkish War (1877–78).

== Career ==
Born in 1839, Meves studied with the Konstantinovsky Cadet Corps, and on 13 August 1853 he became an officer in the Pavlovsky Regiment of the Imperial Guards. In 1863, he participated in the suppression of the Polish uprising and on 12 June was awarded the Order of St. Stanislav, 3rd degree, with the sword and bow.

In the Russian-Turkish war of 1877–1878, Meves was wounded, receiving the Order of St. Vladimir, 4th degree, with the sword and bow. During the march through the Balkans, he received the Order of St. Anne, 2nd degree, with swords. On 12 April 1878 he was promoted to Major general (with seniority from 14 January 1878).

In 1878 Meves was in command of the Imperial Guards 2nd rifle battalion and in 1884, the Pavlovsky Regiment. In 1885, he was appointed Chief of Staff of the 14th Army Corps. In 1894, he headed the 23rd Infantry Division. In 1897, Lieutenant General Meves was appointed Chief of the 2nd Guards Infantry Division and in 1899, commander of the 20th Army Corps. In this role, junior officer Anton Denikin noted in his memoirs that Meves was rare in the Russian Army for not regularly arresting officers for minor offences. He noted that Meves regarded the practice as "highly insulting to the individual, a disgrace to our profession" and instead relied on verbal reprimands and, in extreme cases, dismissal from the service. Meves died in 1901.

Preceded by	Commander of the 23rd Infantry Division (Russian Empire); 1894-1897	Succeeded by
Preceded by	Commander of the 20th Army Corps; 1899 - February 22, 1901	Succeeded by
