= Friedrich von Löwen =

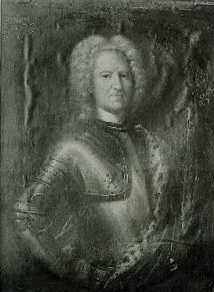
- Friedrich von Löwen in 1750
- Born: July 5, 1654
- Died: July 9, 1744 (aged 90)

Friedrich von Löwen (Russian: Фридрих фон Лёвен; 5 July 1654 – 9 July 1744) was a Baltic German in Russian Empire military service, also a statesman.

In 1710 he left from Swedish military service in favour of Russian military service. 1711–1730 he was vice-governor of Governorate of Estonia, and 1728–1736 General-Governor of this governorate.

== Family ==
Friedrich von Löwen was born July 5, 1654. Father – Georg Johann von Löwen; mother – Barbara Dorothea von Ferzen.
