= Military districts of the Russian Empire =

Type of administrative command of the Imperial Russian Army

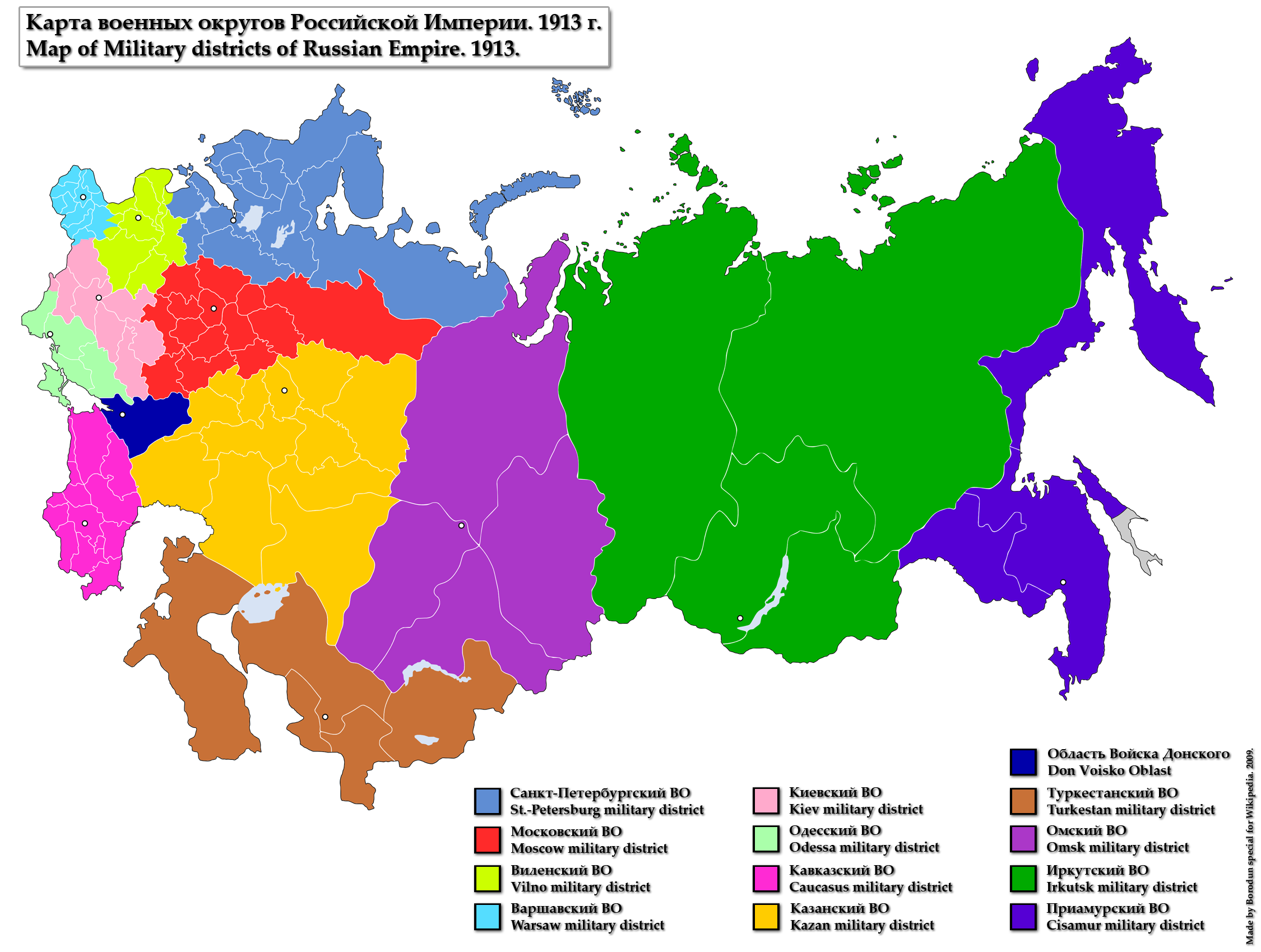
Military districts of the Russian Empire, 1913.

In the Imperial Russian Army, a military district (Russian: вое́нный о́круг, voyenny okrug) was a territorial association of military units, formations, military schools, and various local military establishments. This territorial division type was utilized to provide a more efficient management of army units, their training and other operations activities related to combat readiness.

== History ==
In the Imperial Russian Army, 15 military districts were first formed by Dmitry Milyutin in 1862–64 to replace the pre-existing Military Inspectorates. The military districts were organised to include civilian administration regions of gubernyas and uyezds. By 1892 there were 13 Military Districts in the Russian Empire, and one region with the status of a military district:

1. Petersburg Military District (Петербу́ргский вое́нный о́круг) – Saint Petersburg, Olonets, Arkhangelsk, Novgorod, Pskov, Estonia and four uyezds of the Livonia gubernya (Pernov, Fellinskiy, Valkskiy and Verrosskiy)
2. Vilno Military District (Ви́ленский вое́нный о́круг) – Vilno, Grodno, Kovno, Kurland, Livonia (without above mentioned four uyezds), Vitebsk, Mogilev, Minsk and Suwałki (without the Shchuchinsk uyezd)
3. Warsaw Military District (Варша́вский вое́нный о́круг) – Congress Poland without the part of Suwałki in Vilno Military District
4. Kiev Military District (Ки́евский вое́нный о́круг) – Kiev, Podolia, Volhynia, Chernigov, Poltava, Kharkov, Kursk
5. Odessa Military District (Оде́сский вое́нный о́круг) – Bessarabia, Kherson, Yekaterinoslav, Taurida
6. Moscow Military District (Моско́вский вое́нный о́круг) – Moscow, Smolensk, Tver, Yaroslavl, Kostroma, Vologda, Vladimir, Nizhniy-Novgorod, Kaluga, Tula, Ryazan, Orel, Tambov, Voronezh
7. Kazan Military District (Каза́нский вое́нный о́круг) – Kazan, Vyatka, Perm, Ufa, Simbirsk, Samara, Penza, Saratov, Astrakhan (with the Astrakhan, Ural and Orenburg Cossack host troops)
8. Caucasus Military District (Кавка́зский вое́нный о́круг) – Stavropol gubernya with the entire Caucasus and Transcaucasia (including the Kuban and Terek Cossack host troops)
9. Turkestan Military District (Туркеста́нский вое́нный о́круг) – the region (область): Syr-Darya (with the Amu Dar'ya subdivision), Samarkand and Fergana
10. Omsk Military District (О́мский вое́нный о́круг) – Tobolsk and Tomsk guberniyas, the Akmolinsk, Semipalatinsk and Semirechye regions (with the local Cossack troops).
11. Irkutsk Military District (Ирку́тский вое́нный о́круг) – Irkutsk and Yeniseysk Governorates and the Yakutsk region (with the local Cossack troops).
12. Amur Military District (Аму́рский вое́нный о́круг) – regions of Transbaikal, Amur (with the local Cossack troops), Pacific coast region and the Sakhalin island
13. Don Host Oblast, In the Donskoy military district the right and responsibility of the Commander of forces and Governor-Generalship were entrusted to the appointed ataman; control of the military district consisted of Don Cossack host staff and administration.

During World War I the remnants of occupied Vilno Military District were organized into two districts: Dvina and Minsk.

The Commander of the military district was named Commanding troops of (name) military district (in the Petersburg military district – Commander-in-Chief who was the Tsar), with all troops, military institutions and military ranks of the military region subordinated to them.

In some regions the military district commander was simultaneously the local Governor-General.

Control of military district included the military-district council and functional district staff and the administrations of artillery, engineers, commissariat and military medical service.

However by the beginning of the First World War there were 12 military districts remaining: Dvinsk, Irkutsk, Caucasus, Kazan, Kiev, Minsk, Moscow, Odessa, Omsk, Petrograd, Amur and Turkestan.

=== Former districts ===
- Finland Military District (Финля́ндский вое́нный о́круг) – included all eight Provinces of the Grand Duchy of Finland (1864-1905). It was merged into the Petersburg Military District in 1905.
- Kharkov Military District (1864–1888)
- Riga Military District (1864–1870)
- Orenburg Military District (1865–1881)
- West Siberian Military District (1822–1882)
- East Siberian Military District (1865–1884)
- Siberian Military District (1899–1906)
- Transcaspian Oblast in (1890–1899)
- Trans Amur District of Separate Border Guard Corps in (1901–1914)
