= Pavlovsky Life Guards Regiment =

Regiment in the Russian Empire

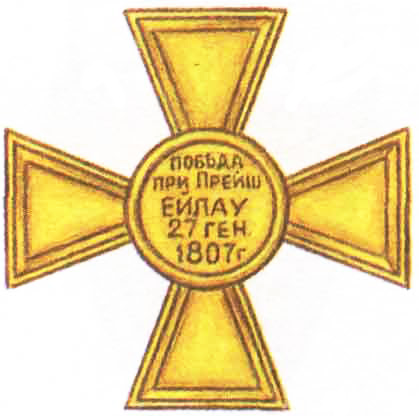
- Badge of the regiment
- Active: 1796–1918
- Country: Russian Empire
- Branch: Russian Imperial Army
- Role: Guards Infantry
- Garrison/HQ: Saint Petersburg
- Engagements: French Invasion of Russia; War of the Seventh Coalition; Decembrist revolt; Russo-Persian War (1826–1828); Russo-Turkish War (1828–1829); November Uprising; January Uprising; Russo-Turkish War of 1877–78; World War I; Russian Civil War

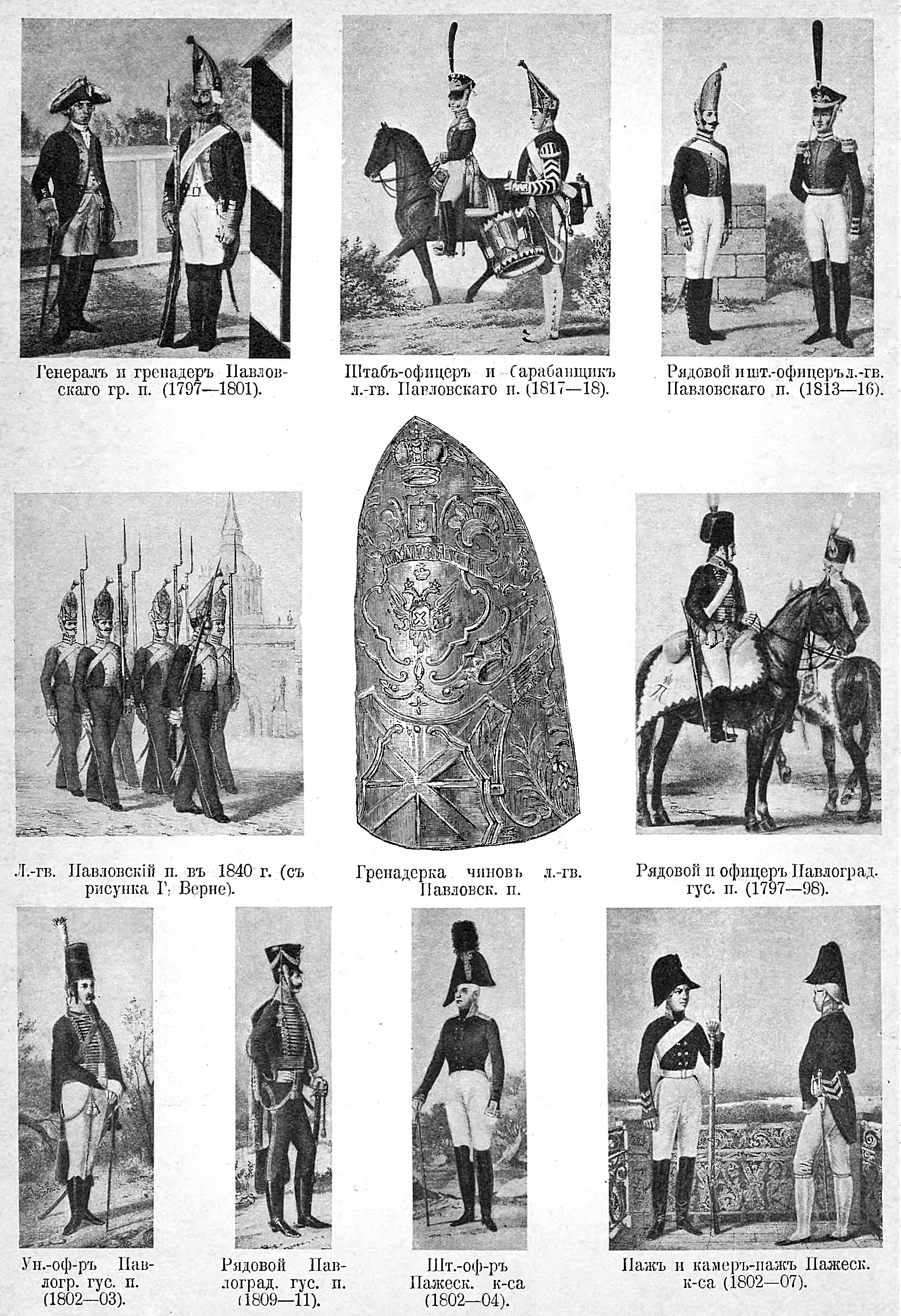
Uniforms of the Pavlovsky Regiment

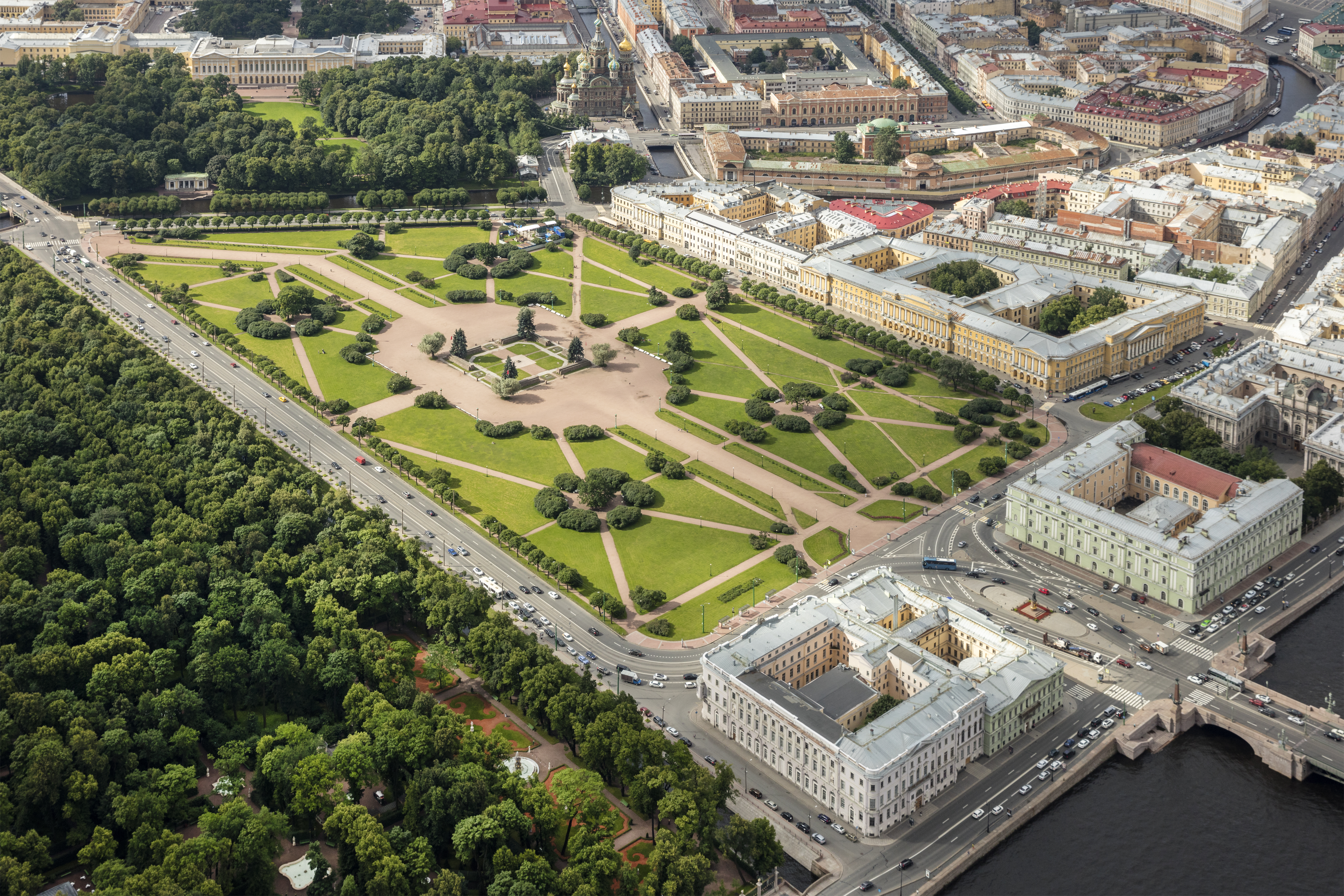
Barracks of the Pavlovsky Regiment, Field of Mars (yellow building with three courtyards along the park's shorter long edge, right-upper in the picture)

Pavlovsky Guard Regiment (Russian: Павловский лейб-гвардии полк) was a Russian Imperial Guard infantry regiment. It was formed out of two battalions of the Moscow Grenadiers on November 19, 1796. They were given the title of Pavlovsky Life-Guard (Russian: лейб-гвардии: лейб- from German Leib, lit. 'body'; гвардия, gvardiya from Italian guardia 'guard') on April 13, 1813, for their deeds during the French invasion of Russia.

== History ==
=== 1796–1813 ===
The Pavlovsky Grenadiers were formed from two detached battalions of the Moscow Grenadiers in November 19, 1796. The basis of their formation was the 77th Tengisky infantry regiment who possessed a similar uniform. They were sent as part of the expedition to Holland in 1799. They were sent to Hanover as part of the Hanover Expedition in 1805 and participated in the War of the Fourth Coalition as well. They took part in the Battle of Czarnowo, where they repulsed the second French attack and under the command of Major Palibin and Lieutenant Colonel Lokhov recaptured a height on the Russian left, dislodging the French in hand-to-hand fighting and recapturing a light battery. The battle of Czarnowo is also where the regiment is known to have distinguished themselves in the fighting.

Their participation in the Battle of Eylau included flanking the French under Major Makhov and Captain Panov, utilising a battalion and two companies respectively. They turned back a cavalry charge from Murat's horsemen and captured multiple prisoners, and went on to repulse attacks from Moran, Saint-Illaire and Gudin's divisions.

With the regiment's battalions effectively dispersed across the 3rd Infantry corps under Tuchkov's 1st Western Army and the 32nd infantry division, they fought in numerous battles.

The Battle of Klyastitsy is among their distinguishing moments. Under Captain Kyrlov, the 2nd battalion pursued the dislodged French, who had set fire to the only bridge across the Nischu river. They stormed the bridge regardless and continued a pursuit of the French infantry, routing them off the field at bayonet point.

Their contributions to the Battle of Borodino were made in the fight against V Corps, initially repulsing them from the Utitska village and heavily damaging a French column in the fighting.

On the day of April 13, 1813, they were given the title of Pavlovsky Life-Guard for the courage rendered in the Patriotic war.

== Campaigns ==
1799–1813
French Revolutionary and Napoleonic Wars
1828–1829
Russo-Turkish War
1831
Polish campaign
1863–1864
Polish campaign
1877–1878
Russo-Turkish War
1914–1917
First World War

== Commanders ==
- Dmitry Neverovsky
- Richard Troyanovich Meves

== Memorials ==
There is a memorial to the Pavlovsky regiment at Borodino's fields.

== Sources ==
- Gorokhoff, Gerard (2002). Русская императорская гвардия [Russian Imperial Guard] (in Russian). Moscow: Рейтарр. ISBN 5-8067-0003-8.
- British General Staff (1996). Handbook of the Russian Army 1914 (Battery Press reprint ed.).
- Govault, O. X. (1852). History of the Life-Guard Pavlovsky Regiment.
