= 20th Army Corps (Russian Empire) =

- Active: 1899–1917
- Disbanded: 1917
- Country: Russian Empire
- Branch: (Russian Empire) Imperial Russian Army
- Garrison/HQ: Riga
- Engagements: World War I: Eastern Front; Battle of Tannenberg; Second Battle of the Masurian Lakes

Commanders
- Notable commanders: See "Commanders" section

The Twentieth Army Corps (Russian: 20-й армейский корпус) was a formation of the Imperial Russian Army that was first raised in 1899, and most famous for fighting on the Eastern Front in World War I, most notably during the Second Battle of the Masurian Lakes. Before World War I, the 20th Corps was stationed in the Vilna Military District with its headquarters in Riga. At the outbreak of the war, the corps consisted of two infantry divisions and a number of independent battalions and brigades. Many Lithuanians served in this unit with the 28th Division having particularly many Lithuanians, especially in the 109th and 111th Infantry Regiments. Some regiments in this Corps were 80% Latvian. The corps was demobilized in April 1917.

== Formation ==
In 1899, the corps was formed from the 29th and 45th Infantry Divisions. It was under the command of Lieutenant general Richard Troyanovich Meves.

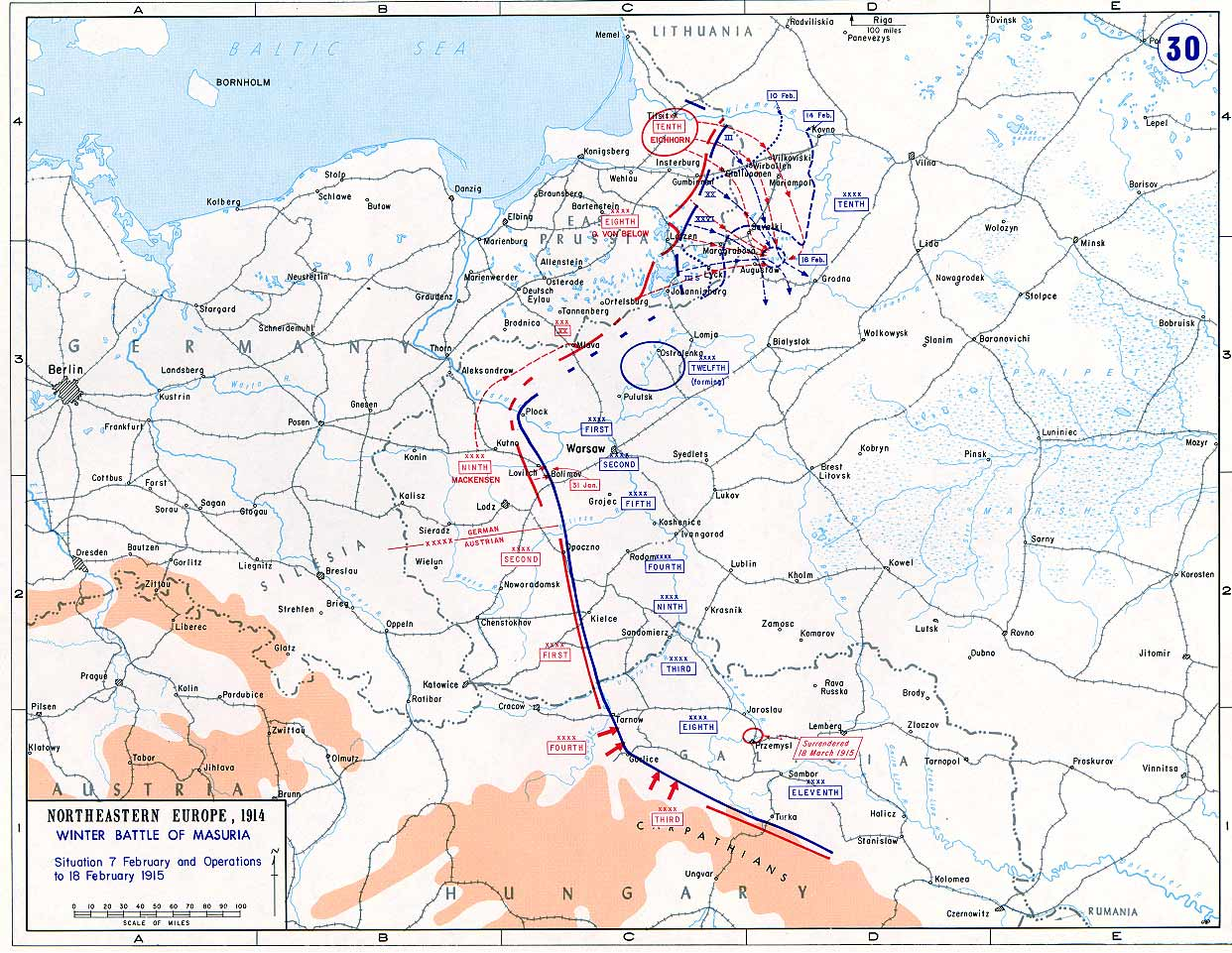
Actions during the winter battle at the Masurian Lakes.

== World War I ==
During the Second Battle of the Masurian Lakes, the 20th Army Corps was led by General Pavel Illyich Bulgakov. On February 7, in the middle of a snowstorm, Fritz von Below's German Eighth Army launched a surprise attack, advancing 70 miles (110 km) within one week. They inflicted severe casualties on the Imperial Russian Army, resulting in its disorderly withdrawal with many of its soldiers being imprisoned. The greatest loss came when the 20th Army Corps was surrounded by the German Tenth Army in the Augustów Forest. Although many fought their way out, the Corps' remnants surrendered on February 21. A large number of Latvian soldiers were killed, wounded or captured during this battle. This influenced the decision of the Imperial Russian Army to establish the Latvian Riflemen.

== Composition ==
Shortly before the outbreak of World War I, on 1 January 1913, the 20th Army Corps comprised the following units:

20th Army Corps order of battle
Division	Brigade	Regiment	Battalion
28th Infantry Division	1st Brigade	109th Infantry Regiment 110th Infantry Regiment	
28th Infantry Division	2nd Brigade	111th Infantry Regiment 112th Infantry Regiment	
28th Infantry Division	28th Artillery Brigade		
29th Infantry Division	1st Brigade	113th Infantry Regiment 114th Infantry Regiment	
29th Infantry Division	2nd Brigade	115th Infantry Regiment 116th Infantry Regiment	
29th Infantry Division	29th Artillery Brigade		
—	1st Separate Cavalry Brigade	19th Dragoon Regiment 16th Hussar Regiment	
—			20th Howitzer Artillery Battalion; 1st Heavy Artillery Battalion; 20th Sapper Battalion; 1st Pontoon Battalion; 2nd Pontoon Battalion; 2nd Cadre Supply-Train Battalion; 1st Siege Engineer Park

At different times during the war, the 20th Corps was part of several different field armies, including the 1st, 2nd, 3rd, 4th, and 10th.

== Commanders ==
The 20th corps was led by the following commanders throughout its existence:

20th Army Corps commanders
Appointed	Commander	Dismissed
1899	Lieutenant General Richard Troyanovich Meves	22 February 1901
? 1901	Cavalry General Semyon Vasilyevich Kakhanov	? 1904
12 January 1905	Lieutenant General Woldemar von Boeckmann	11 June 1906
28 June 1908	Infantry General Vladimir Vasilyevich Smirnov	December 1914
December 1914	Lieutenant General Pavel Bulgakov	February 1915
March 1915	Infantry General Alexander Ievreinov	April 1917
April 1917	Lieutenant General Alexander Yakovich Elshin	April 1917?

== See also ==
- List of Imperial Russian Army formations and units

== Citations ==
=== References ===
- Leonard, Raymond (2007). From War through Revolution: The Story of the Latvian Rifles (PDF). Nebraska, CO: 32nd Annual European Studies Conference. Archived from the original (PDF) on 2011-06-12.
