= Pyotr Albedinsky =

Russian military officer and politician

Pyotr Pavlovich Albedinsky
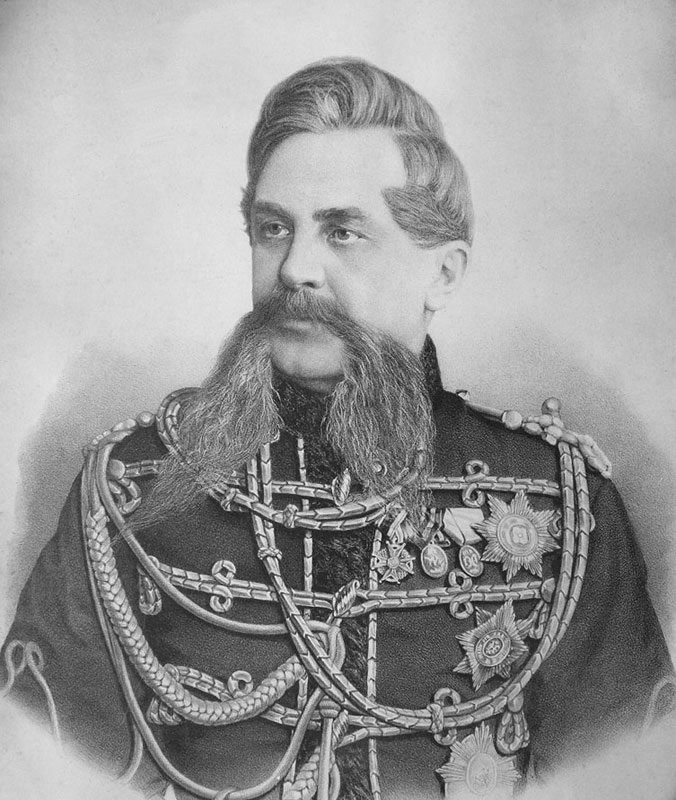
- Pyotr Pavlovich Albedinsky

Personal details
- Born: September 4, 1826 Moscow, Russian Empire
- Died: May 19, 1883 (aged 56) Warsaw, Russian Empire

Pyotr Pavlovich Albedinsky (1826–1883) was a Russian military officer and politician.

== Personal life ==
Descended from the nobility of Smolensk province, Pyotr Pavlovich Albedinsky was born in Moscow on 4 September 1826 and died in Warsaw on May 19, 1883. His father was the illegitimate son of the chief chamberlain, Peter Romanovich Albedil.

Lacking any higher military education or special advantages, Albedinsky advanced his military career mostly through connections at the Czar's court. Having assimilated the requirements of military service in peacetime, possessing common sense and a humane heart, he showed solicitude for the troops and enjoyed popularity among them. He took care concerning the education and combat training of troops and was the head of various committees and sessions which developed many instructions and regulations.

Albedinsky married Alexandra Sergeyevna (née Princess Dolgorukova). They had three children: Maria, Olga, and Alexander. Maurice Palaeologus believes that the marriage was arranged by Czar Alexander II. In addition, Albedinsky had an illegitimate son (by Countess Rostopchina) Hippolytus (1845 – after 1917, Vice Governor of Minsk, Chamberlain).

== Early military career ==
At the end of his apprenticeship in the Corps of Pages, on August 2, 1843, Albedinsky became Cornet in the Life Guards Cavalry Regiment, wherein he received promotions to the ranks of Lieutenant (December 6, 1844), Staff-Captain (April 21, 1848) and Captain (August 30, 1848). He took part in the Hungarian campaign of 1849. On November 4, 1852, he was appointed the commander of his squadron, and June 25, 1853, became his regiment's adjutant commander.

In February and May 1854, Albedinsky was in the Vitebsk province to supervise recruiting for the Crimean War. He became a Colonel on September 20, 1854, and was sent to the Chief of land and naval forces in the Crimea, Prince Menshikov, taking part in the hostilities in Sevastopol. During the battle on October 24, 1854, at Inkerman he was seriously wounded in the head, which courageous service earned him a golden sword inscribed "For Bravery" (March 31, 1856). Completing his stay in the army, he was sent to Orenburg with the manifesto of the accession to the throne of Czar Alexander II.

== Diplomatic career ==
In 1856, Albedinsky was komandiruem in Paris: authorized to communicate Russian emergency dispatches to Adjutant-General Prince A. F. Orlov for presentation to French Emperor Napoleon III at the Paris Peace Conference. He earned the Insignia St. Andrew, and at the behest of Napoleon, was awarded the Officer's Cross of the Order of the Legion of Honor. Upon completion of his last mission during his first tour in Paris, Albedinsky was awarded the Order of St. Stanislaus 2nd degree (April 16, 1856).

Albedinsky was present in Moscow for the coronation celebrations of Alexander II between August 26, and September 7, 1856, delayed since the Czar's ascension in 1855 by the Crimean War. Thereafter, he was sent back to Paris as a correspondent for the Ministry of War at the Russian embassy, for completion of which mission on September 29, 1857, he received the Order of St. Vladimir 4th degree. According to General N. G. Zalesova, the handsome Albedinsky grew too close to Empress Eugenie, whereupon Napoleon confidentially asked he be recalled to Russia. He was withdrawn and in 1858 returned to Russia, where on September 27 he was given command of the Life Guards Horse-Grenadier Regiment.

== Later military career ==
On April 17, 1860, with his appointment to the retinue of the Czar, Albedinsky was promoted to Major General. On May 4, 1862, he took command of the Life Guards Hussars Regiment. On January 4, 1865, he was appointed Chief of Staff of the Guard troops and Commander of the St. Petersburg Military District.

== Ministerial career ==
On March 27, 1866, Albedinsky was made Adjutant-General, and on 9 October, with promotion to Lieutenant General, became Governor-General of Livonia, Courland and Estland and Commander of the Riga Military District. He was relieved at his own request after September 29, 1870, and received the Order of the White Eagle.

On July 22, 1874, Albedinsky took the posts of Governor-General of Vilna, Kovno and Grodno and Commander of the Vilna Military District, remaining in them until 1880. He was promoted to General of Cavalry during this period, on April 16, 1878.

On May 18, 1880, Albedinsky succeeded Count Paul Demetrius von Kotzebue as Governor-General of Warsaw (i.e., the Viceroy of Russian Poland) and Commander of the Warsaw Military District, posts he held until his death in 1883. On January 1, 1881, he became a member of the State Council of the Russian Empire. On March 13 that year, the Czar finally fell victim to the last of many assassination attempts during his reign, which brought forth the scapegoating of the Russian Empire's Jews, who dwelt largely within Albedinsky's realm.

== Awards ==
Albedinsky was honored with membership in the Order of St. Stanislaus, 2nd degree (1856), 1st degree (August 30, 1864); the Order of St. Anna, 1st degree (July 7, 1867); the Order of the White Eagle (1870); the Order of St. Alexander Nevsky (June 24, 1875); and the Order of St. Vladimir, 4th degree (1857), 1st degree (May 15, 1883).

Albedinsky died on May 19, 1883, in Warsaw and was buried at the Kazan cemetery in Tsarskoye Selo.
