= 29th Infantry Division (Russian Empire) =

- 29-я пехотная дивизия
- Active: 1914–1918
- Country: Russian Empire
- Branch: Russian Imperial Army
- Role: Infantry

The 29th Infantry Division (Russian: 29-я пехо́тная диви́зия, 29-ya Pekhotnaya Diviziya) was an infantry formation of the Russian Imperial Army. It was part of the 20th Army Corps.

== Organization ==
- 1st Brigade
  - 113th Starorus Russian Infantry Regiment "Old"
  - 114th Infantry Regiment "Novotorzhsky"
- 2nd Brigade
  - 115th Infantry Regiment "Vyazemsky"
  - 116th Infantry Regiment "Maloyaroslavsky"
- 29th Artillery Brigade

== Commanders ==
- 1863-1864: Mikhail Likhutin
- 1869-1878: Alexander Alekseyevich Svechin
- 1890-1896: Nikolay Dmitrievich Tatischev
- 1914-1915: Anatoly Rosenshield

== Chiefs of Staff ==
- 1863: Nikolay Matveyevich Turbin
- 1875-1876: Mitrofan Petrovich Tchaikovsky
- 1889-1896: Ivan Nadarov

== Commanders of the 1st Brigade ==
- 1902-1906: Alexander Iosafovich Ievreinov
