= 28th Infantry Division (Russian Empire) =

- 28-я пехотная дивизия
- Active: 1863–1918
- Country: Russian Empire
- Branch: Russian Imperial Army
- Role: Infantry
- Garrison/HQ: Kaunas Fortress
- Nickname: River Division

The 28th Infantry Division (Russian: 28-я пехо́тная диви́зия, romanized: 28-ya pekhotnaya diviziya, Lithuanian: 28-oji pėstininkų divizija) was an infantry division of the Russian Imperial Army. It was part of the 20th Army Corps. Sometimes the division was nicknamed as the river division, because all of its regiments were named after rivers. Those rivers were the Volga, Kama, Don, and the Ural.

Many Lithuanians served in this division, with the 109th and 111th Infantry Regiments having particularly many Lithuanians in them. Regardless, the division was assigned to the 1st Army's 20th Army Corps. In the latter half of 1914, this infantry division endured harsh battles in East Prussia, although it met its end with the rest of the 20th Army Corps in the Augustavas Forest.

== Division's dislocation ==
The division's headquarters were located entirely in Kaunas from 1903 to 1913. The 28th Infantry Division was located in the Kaunas Fortress and was trained for its defence, so it was not prepared for field battles.

== Order of Battle ==
- 1st Brigade
  - 109th Infantry Regiment
  - 110th Infantry Regiment
- 2nd Brigade
  - 111th Infantry Regiment
  - 112th Infantry Regiment
- 28th Artillery Brigade
