= Pyotr Vannovsky =

Russian statesman

- Пётр Ванновский
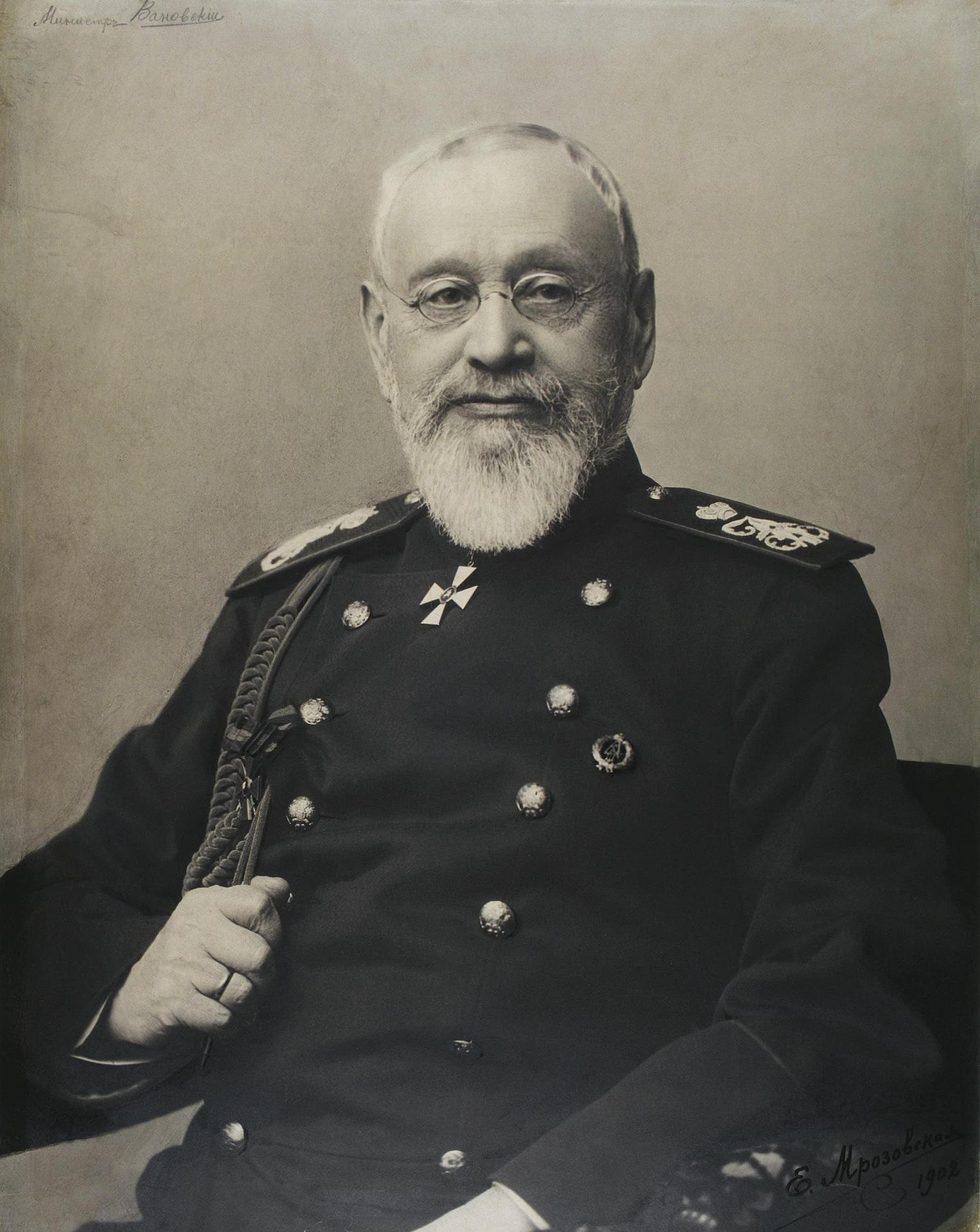
- Adjutant-General Pyotr Vannovsky, c. 1902.

Russian Minister of War
- In office 3 June [O.S. 22 May] 1881 (Manager of the Ministry of War until 13 January [O.S. 1] 1882) – 13 January [O.S. 1] 1898
- Monarchs: Alexander III; Nicholas II
- Preceded by: Dmitry Milyutin
- Succeeded by: Aleksey Kuropatkin

Minister of National Education
- In office 6 April [O.S. 24 March] 1901 – 24 April [O.S. 11] 1902
- Monarch: Nicholas II
- Preceded by: Nikolay Bogolepov
- Succeeded by: Grigori Zenger

Personal details
- Born: 6 December [O.S. 24 November] 1822 Kiev, Kiev Governorate, Russian Empire
- Died: 1 March [O.S. 17 February] 1904 (aged 81) Saint Petersburg, Russian Empire
- Resting place: Nikolskoe Cemetery, Alexander Nevsky Lavra
- Children: Sergei Petrovich; Boris Petrovich; Anna Petrovna

Military service
- Allegiance: Russian Empire
- Branch/service: (Russian Empire) Imperial Russian Army
- Years of service: 1840–1898
- Rank: General of the Infantry
- Commands: 12th Infantry Division; 33rd Infantry Division; 12th Army Corps; Ruschuk Detachment
- Battles/wars: Hungarian Campaign; Crimean War; Siege of Silistra; Russo-Turkish War; Battle of Katselovo; Battle of Ablanovo; Siege of Plevna; Battle of Shipka Pass
- Awards: Russian: Foreign:

Pyotr Semyonovich Vannovsky (Russian: Пётр Семёнович Ванно́вский; (Note: Pre-1918: Пётръ Семёновичъ Ванновскій) Belarusian: Пётр Сямёнавіч Ванновскі, romanized: Pyotr Syamyonavich Vannovski; 6 December [O.S. 24 November] 1822 – 1 March [O.S. 17 February] 1904) was a Russian statesman and military leader of Belarusian extraction, who served in the Imperial Russian Army. He was also an honorary member of the Academy of Military Medical, the Mikhailovsky Artillery School, the Mykolaiv Engineering School, the Imperial Academy of Sciences, and a full cavalier of the Order of St. Vladimir.

Born in Kiev into a family of Belarusian landed gentry, Vannovsky chose his career early on in his life and began military schooling. After a few years, he participated in the Hungarian Revolution of 1848 and the Crimean War as part of the Life Guards Finnish Regiment, distinguishing himself at the Siege of Silistra, he was highly decorated after the war, becoming the head of his own regiment, and several military schools. During the Russo-Turkish War of 1877–1878, he took the prominent role as the chief of staff of the Ruschuk Detachment, under the Tsesarevich, future emperor Alexander III. Taking part in many minor but important campaigns, especially a campaign for breaking the Siege of Plevna and the battle between Trastenik and Mechka. For his and Alexander's achievements, they were both awarded the Order of St. George of the 3rd and 2nd degree respectively. A few years after the war, Alexander ascended to the throne, and Vannnovsky was subsequently appointed Minister of War.

Vannovsky was one of the most successful Minister of War during the course of the Russian Empire, he was in office during most of the reign of Emperor Alexander III and the early reign of Emperor Nicholas II from 1881 to 1898, he was credited with maintaining order, preventing corruption and reforming the Russian military during his role as the Minister of War. But after Vannovsky resigned, he had warned the military about modern war tactics, should the general's warning be remembered by the generals of the next generation (those who served in the Russo-Japanese War and the First World War), the Russian performance in the Russo-Japanese War and the First World War would have been completely different. He also briefly served as the Minister of National Education from 1901 to 1902. After which he retired and died suddenly in 1904 following the Russo-Japanese War, perhaps dying upon learning of the disastrous war with Japan.

== Early life ==
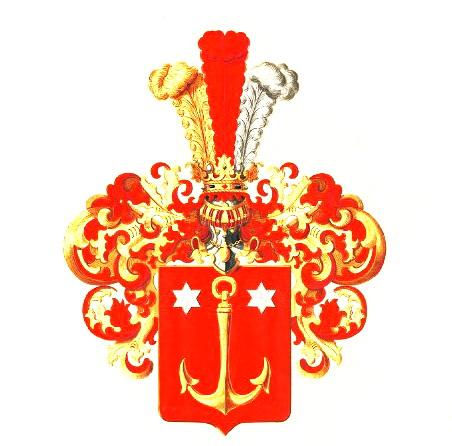
Coat of arms of the Vannovsky Family (granted in 1892)

Pyotr Semyonovich Vannovsky was born 6 December [O.S. 24 November] 1822 in Kiev to Semyon Ivanovich Vannovsky, who was from the Gentry Vannovsky family of Belarusian origin from Minsk. His father Semyon was a well-educated man who taught French in the 1st Kiev Gymnasium. And Pyotr, followed to the Vannovsky Family tradition to choose his future career at a young age, he chose to serve in the military and was strongly supported by his father. So as a result, he moved to Moscow and attended the 1st Moscow Cadet Corps, one of the best cadet corps in Russia. Upon graduating, he joined the Life Guards Finnish Regiment, and participated in the Hungarian Revolution against the Hungarian Revolutionaries and the Crimean War as part of the three Finnish battalion Vannovsky's regiment belonged to. In mid 1854, he and the battalions met the Ottomans near the Ottoman villages of Tutrakan and Silistra, and the Siege of Silistra took place. He distinguished himself as a brave but sane soldier during the siege. Later for military distinction, he was awarded the Order of St. Vladimir of the 4th degree with swords and a bow, and was subsequently appointed the commander of his own regiment. After hostility ended in 1857, he became the head of several military schools, and thanks to his efforts, many infantry officers had been trained to take up the post of small unit commander and managing weapons, and those who graduated in the first category was granted the next rank ahead of the schedule. He was later promoted to major-general in 1861.

In 1868, he was promoted to lieutenant-general and was appointed commander of the 12th Infantry Division, this division consisted of the 46th Infantry Regiment of the Dnieper, the 47th infantry Ukraine regiment, 48th infantry Odessa Emperor Alexander I regiment. Later he was then appointed chief of staff of the 12th Army Corps in 1871, in which he eventually commanded in the Russo-Turkish War in 1877.

In 1876, General Vannovsky was appointed chief of staff of the newly formed 33rd Infantry Division, which included the 129th Infantry Regiment of Bessarabia, the 130th Infantry Regiment of Kherson, the 131st Infantry Regiment of Tiraspol and the 132nd Infantry Regiment of Bendery. It was a pretty challenging task to form a new unit, but with a determined general such as Vannovsky, he coped with the task easily, which he was noted by the high command of the Kiev Military District.

== Russo-Turkish War ==
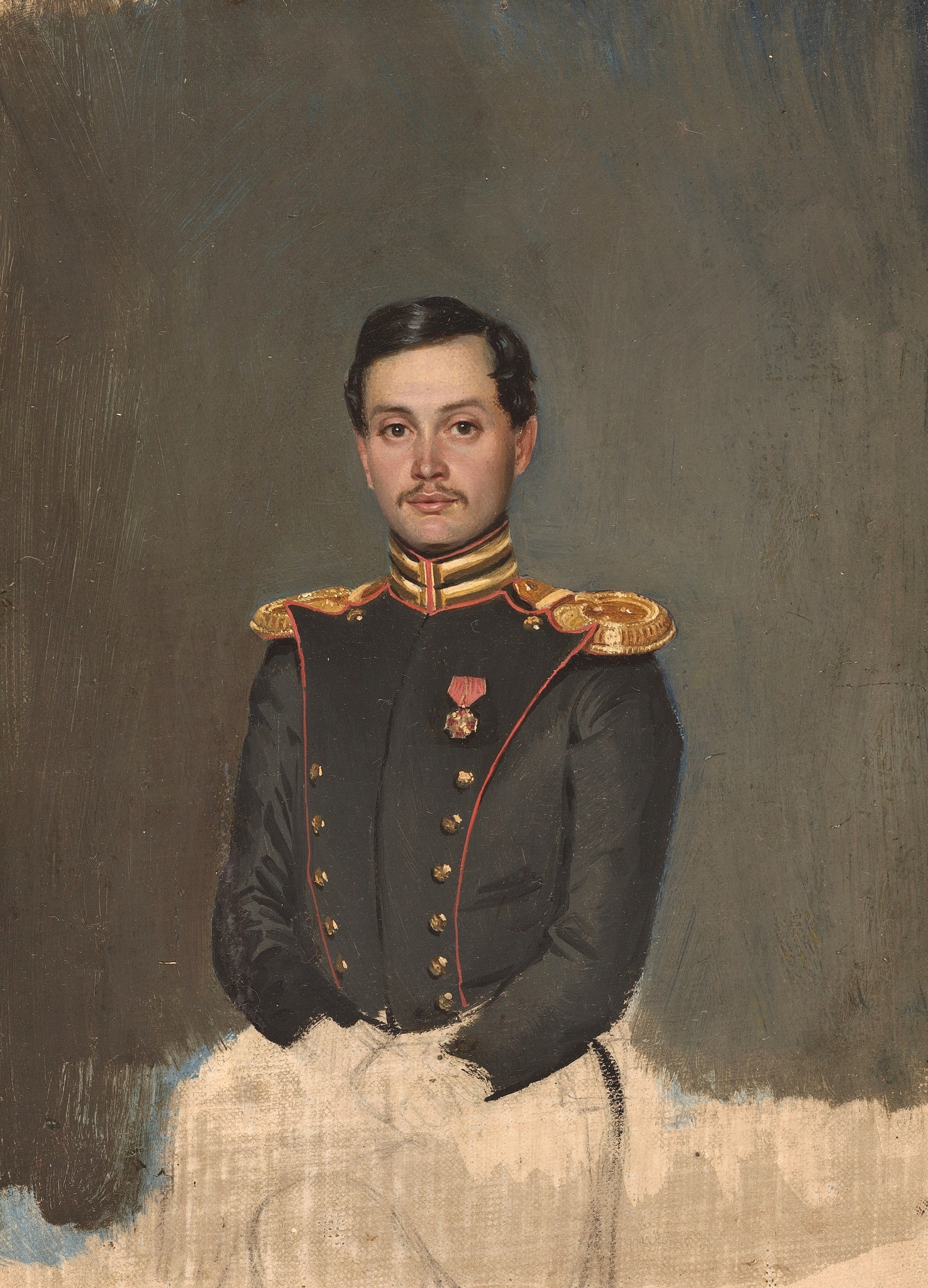
Portrait of Staff captain Vannovsky, 1849

At the beginning of the Russo-Turkish War, he commanded the 12th Army Corps to crossed the Danube, the Army Corps was later incorporated into the Ruschuk Detachment (the Eastern Detachment), for which he was appointed chief of staff of it, commanded by the tsesarevich, the future emperor Alexander III, whom he would become close friend with after the war. The Ruschuk Detachment was exceptionally powerful among other Russian units. It was composed of the 12th and the 13th Army Corps, 49 battalions, 19 Cossack divisions and 224 guns. The task of the detachment was to take the small Ottoman towns of Ruse and Nikopol, but when they arrived, they were attacked by the Ottomans and as a result, they went fully defensive, but they could still break through the Ottomans and won significant victories. Later on the Ottomans launched at Katselovo, forcing the Russians to retreat to Gorsko Ablanovo. There, another battle would take place, which would once again end in an Ottoman victory. After some time, the Ottoman high command made a decision to attack the right flank and the center of the Ruschuk Detachment with 28 squadrons and 84 guns, in order to encircle the detachment from the rear. But the plan was later unravelled by Vannovsky, and the Russian Army soon went to defensive position. On 9 September, when the Ottomans attacked, they got counter-attacked by the Russians, inflicting considerable casualties on the Ottomans; nevertheless, the Ottomans had emerged victorious.

Now with Plevna captured, Commander-in-chief Grand Duke Nicholas Nikolaevich changed the original plan completely, the Ruschuk Detachment went completely defensive, with the task of continue protecting the Russian rear.

=== Battle at Trastenik and Mechka ===
On 14 November, Suleiman Pasha with his men tried strike the Russian Army rear once again, and a decisive battle took place between the Bulgarian villages of Trastenik and Mechka. During the battle, the Ottomans, having superiority in manpower and artilleries, went on an offensive, inflicting the main blow at the right flank of the Russian Army. And the Russians, led by Grand Duke Vladimir Alexandrovich, decided to retreat. Further unravelling revealed that the Ottomans planned to play defensive against the left and center of the Russians, and concentrate the troops to strike on the right flank of them. The battle developed well for the Russians, later with the support of the 2nd Brigade of the 35th Infantry Division, a Ukrainian Regiment and reinforced by the cavalry of Freiherr von Driesen, the Ruschuk Detachment advanced and launched an attack on the left flank of the Ottomans. The Ottomans' defense broke and the center and left flank of the Ruschuk Detachment went on an offensive, during which Ottoman troops completely broke down. In this battle, the Ruschuk Detachment's casualties were about 850 men, and the Ottomans lost more than 3,000 men.

Later, for bravery and military distinction in the battle, the Tsesarevich was awarded the Order of St. George of the 2nd degree, the highest military decoration in the Russian Empire. While General Vannovsky was appointed General Adjutant and awarded the order of the 3rd degree with the inscription "As a reward of courage, bravery and orderliness rendered in affairs against the Turks and active participation in the repulse of repeated enemy attacks on the positions occupied by the troops of the 12th and 13th Army Corps".

After that victory, the Ruschuk Detachment continued carrying out defensive tasks. The Ruschuk Detachment by that time was considered to be the road to victory by many Russian officers through all the minor but extremely important tasks successfully carried out by the detachment.

For five months the troops of the Ruschuk detachment, under the command and leadership of the heir to the Russian throne and then the emperor of the great Russia Alexander III, stood almost unceasing battles and battles with the enemy, constantly exceeding their number (sometimes several times), which had the benefits of an offensive course of action, on strong fortresses, having good routes of communication and being led to be considered the best of Turkish commanders. With his unseen but extremely important service, the Ruschuk detachment not only facilitated, but also enabled the entire Russian army to win at other, more important points of the theater of war -Julian Zayonchkovsky

By the end of the year, the Russian high command described the actions of the Ruschuk Detachment over the war as follows:

The troops of Ruschuk deserve considerable honor and our gratitude. Of the detachment, which had a difficult and difficult task to protect the left flank of the huge space that we had occupied since the beginning of the campaign. This task was accomplished brilliantly, despite the difficulties stemming from the need to detain, for a long time, the vastly superior forces of the enemy, constantly making attempts to break through our defensive lines.

Later, the Ruschuk Detachment was tasked with interrupting the Ottoman communication line between Ruse and Shumen, in order to capture Silistra. In January, they fulfilled the order, interrupting the Ottoman communication between Ruse and Shumen, and captured Silistra. After the battle, Grand Duke Nicholas Nikolaevich offered the Tsesarevich to go on a vacation, he refused and was accepted by the Grand Duke, this would eventually contribute to the development of the successful career of Vannovsky:

Vannovsky's detachment was the first in Russian military history to receive biscuits as food, rather than having bread, to reduce the possibility of getting gastrointestinal disease. This practice then proceeded to extend throughout the Russian Army.

During the war, General Vannovsky showed his talent as a chief of staff, and after the war, he was appointed adjutant-general and commander of the Eastern (later renamed Northern) Detachment. After he was appointed to the detachment, he used this chance to organize the troops as an independent commander, which would soon prove very useful after he became the Minister of War. After a year or so, he was again appointed commander of the 12th Army Corps, the corps that he commanded prior to the war. In 1881, Alexander III ascended to the throne, and many liberal government officials of Alexander II were removed from office, including Minister of War Count Milyutin. After Milyutin's dismissal, Vannovsky was appointed manager of the Ministry of War.

== Minister of War ==
Russia only has two allies: her army and her navy. -Pyotr Vannovsky

In 1862, during the turbulent student protests of Kiev and St. Petersburg, occurring near the Palace Bridge, Vannovsky was called in to control the students. But he found conditions disagreeable, and released almost all students charged with sedition against the university. The Anarchist Peter Kropotkin opined that, "A military officer had thus to interfere for the defense of the students against the Ministry of Public Instruction."

As the Minister of War, the general carry out a strict discipline rule in the army, and life in the military greatly changed, the following were the reforms General Vannovsky carried out:

1. Devices in military control

- The post of Inspector General of the Cavalry and the Inspector General of Engineers were abolished, the duties of which were assigned to the Minister of War.
- Artillery units that made up army corps were transferred from the artillery commanders to be subordinated by the corps commander, aiming to unite all units in the hands of the superiors responsible for the corps during peace and wartimes.
- Mortar field shelves were formed, beginning of transition of batteries to shelves, as to separate from artillery units.
- Additional artillery, infantry and active infantry units were strengthened, and new cavalry cadres were formed.
- Management of fortresses were changed, commandants of their responsible fortresses were appointed owner of it, and were responsible for all of its condition and preparation for mobilization.
- Hunting teams were established and were organised into units, in purposes of developing soldiers' courage.
- Local military administrations were simplified, the posts of chief of local military and provincial military commander were abolished.
- Field control of troops during wartime was changed, military district, when mobilized, now had to appeal directly to the field office, and special units for that were formed.
- Small cadres (including companies, hundreds and batteries) were formed for soldiers and an organization was established in purposes of calling soldiers to training camps.

2. Organization of the army The main ideas of Vannovsky's reforms was to increase the combat part of armed forces at the expense of reducing non-combat elements without needing to increase the overall strength of the army:

- In 1881, the infantry consisted of 879,500 lower rank soldiers, and the cavalry consisted of 137,000 horses. But after the reform of General Vannovsky, the infantry was decreased to only 879,500 infantrymen, and the cavalry was increased to 137,250 horses.
- The number of local non-combat troops were also lowered, instead of 10,000 troops, now there were only 2,400 of them, and the 52,000 troops scattered around numerous departments and establishment, were decreased to 43,000.
- Armed force was increased to 599,000 lower rank officers and 78,500 horses. A special attention was paid to increase the existing number of high rank officers in the active army and to reduce the number of inactive army officers (about a thousand of them were dismissed).
- The regular cavalry was strengthened, many Hussar and Lancer regiments were converted into Dragoon regiments and the number of cossack regiments were increased.
- Many infantry battalions were converted into regiments.
- The number of existing rifle units were increased.
- 4 new regiments and squads were formed in the Caucasus Viceroyalty as reserve troops, and the Finland as well, having 8 new infantry battalions and dragoons formed as reserve troops.
- Field and fortress artilleries, engineering troops, railway brigades were all strengthened.

3. Recruitment of troops

- In 1874, significant changes by General Milyutin were conducted in the charter for military service and a new disciplinary charter center was formed in 1888.
- The service for compulsory troops was reduced by 1 year, and the service for reserve troops was increased by 4 years.

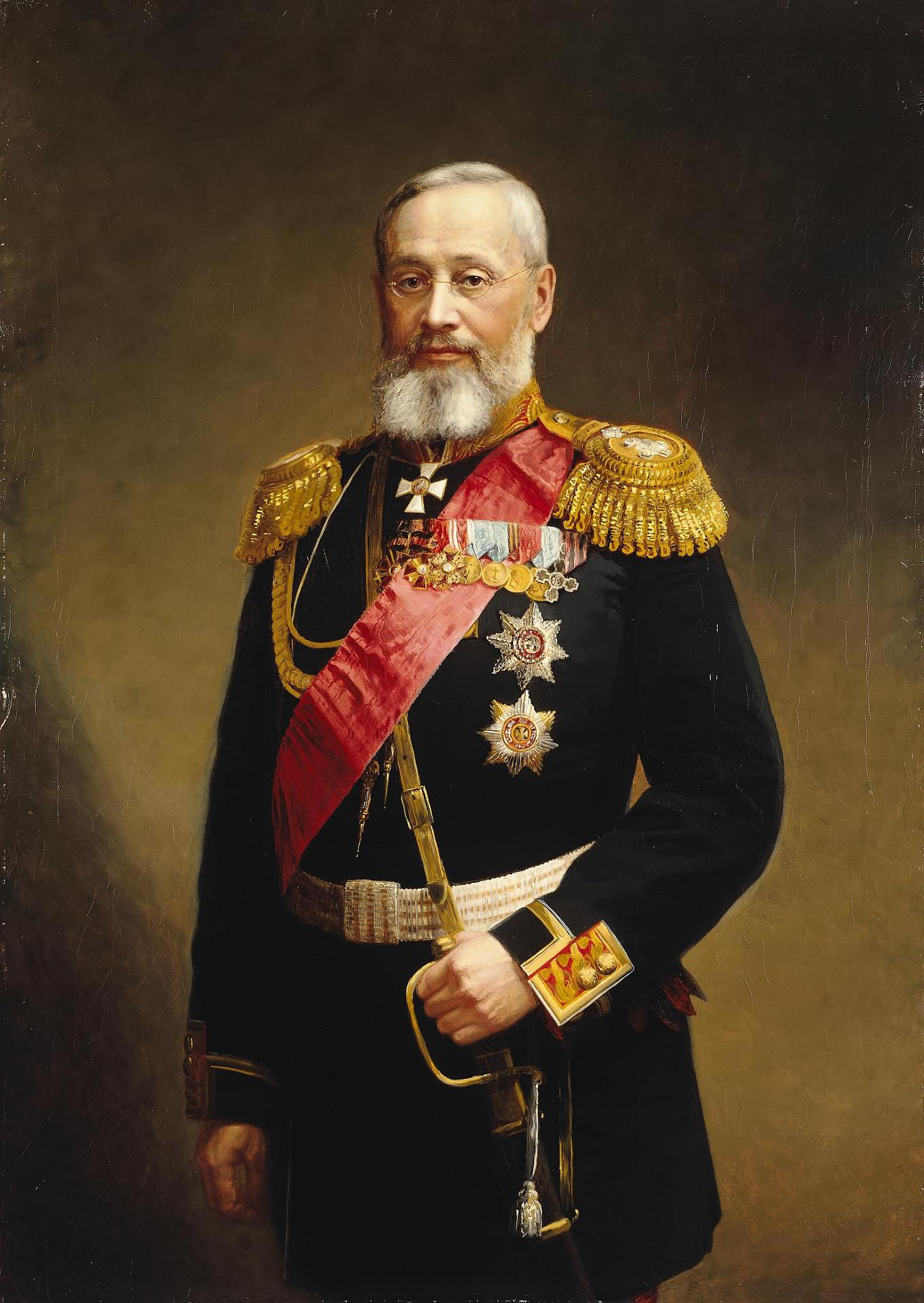
Minister of War Pyotr Vannovsky, c. 1880

During his time of being Minister of War, he, together with the Minister of the Interior Count Tolstoy, had very bad relations with General Iosif Gurko, their relations could only be smoothened by Mikhail Ostrovsky, the Ministry of State Property, who kept a good relation between the three of them. He was also very well respected by many of the staff during his time as Minister of War:

Adjutant General Vannovsky was a Minister of War during the reign of Emperor Alexander III. Emperor Alexander III was very fond of Vannovsky, whom he took from corps commanders in Kiev; he was the chief of staff at the Emperor, when Alexander III was still the Heir-Tsesarevich and commanded a detachment of troops during the eastern Turkish war. Vannovsky was a personality. He was not a man of great education, not of great culture, but he was a man of determination; firmly devoted to the Emperor; a man of order, a bit gall. In any case, we must admit that he kept the Ministry of War in order. -Sergei Witte

== Honours and awards ==
=== Russian ===
- Order of St. Anna, 3rd class (1848)
- Order of St. Anna, 2nd class with the Imperial Crown (1852, Imperial Crown in 1859)
- Order of St. Vladimir, 4th class with swords and a bow (1854)
- Order of St. Stanislaus, 2nd class (1856)
- Order of St. Vladimir, 3rd class (1862)
- Order of St. Stanislaus, 1st class (1867)
- Order of St. Anna, 1st class with the Imperial Crown (1870)
- Order of St. Vladimir, 2nd class (1872)
- Order of the White Eagle (1875)
- Order of St. George, 3rd class (1877)
- Order of St. Alexander Nevsky with diamond signs (1883, diamonds signs in 1886)
- Order of St. Vladimir, 1st class (1890)
- Order of St. Andrew (1895)

=== Foreign ===
- Principality of Montenegro:
  - Montenegrin Gold Medal (1878)
  - Order of Prince Danilo I (1883)
- Principality of Serbia:
  - Order of the Cross of Takovo, 1st class with swords for military distinction (1881, swords in 1891)
- Kingdom of Italy:
  - Order of Saints Maurice and Lazarus, Cavaliere di gran croce (1883)
- Principality of Bulgaria
  - Order of St. Alexander (1883)
- Kingdom of Prussia
  - Order of the Red Eagle, 1st class with a star (1885)
  - Order of the Red Eagle, 1st class with diamonds (1888)
  - Order of the Black Eagle (1897)
- Austrian Empire
  - Order of Leopold, Großkreuz (1885)
- Empire of Japan
  - Order of the Rising Sun, Grand Cordon (1885)
- Emirate of Bukhara:
  - Order of the Rising Star, 1st class with diamonds (1889)
- French Third Republic
  - Legion of Honour, Grand'croix (1891)
- Kingdom of Denmark:
  - Order of the Dannebrog, Storkommandør (1892)
- Grand Duchy of Hesse:
  - Ludwig Order, Großkreuz (1895)
- Kingdom of Hungary
  - Order of St. Stephen of Hungary, Nagykereszt (1897)

== Sources ==
- General of the Infantry Pyotr Semyonovich Vannovsky (ru)
- Vannovsky, Pyotr Semyonovich (1822–1904) (ru)
- Russian Wikipedia
- Witte, Sergei Yulyevich (1960). "Memoirs: Childhood, the Reigns of Alexander II and Alexander III". az.lib.ruz. Sotsekigz. (ru)

Military offices
| Preceded by Dmitry Milyutin | Minister of War; 13 January [O.S. 1] 1882 –13 January [O.S. 1] 1898 | Succeeded by Aleksey Kuropatkin |

Political offices
| Preceded by Nikolay Bogolepov | Minister of National Education; 6 April [O.S. 24 March] 1901 –24 April [O.S. 11] 1902 | Succeeded by Grigori Zenger |
