= Katselovo =

Katselovo Кацелово
- Location of Katselovo
- Coordinates: 43°32.153′N 26°3.508′E
- Country: Bulgaria

Area
  - Total: 47.161 km^{2} (18.209 sq mi)

Population (2015)
  - Total: 663
- Time zone: UTC+2 (EET)
  - Summer (DST): UTC+3 (EEST)
- Postal code: 7160
- Area code: 08149

Katselovo (Bulgarian: Кацелово) is a village in northern Bulgaria, administered by the municipality of Dve Mogili and part of Ruse Province. It lies 35 km south of Ruse on the southern edge of the Rusenski Lom Nature Park, and 16 km southeast of Dve Mogili. The village begins on the bank of the Cherni Lom river which joins with the Beli Lom to produce the Rusenski Lom which flows into the River Danube near Ruse, and rises very steeply to a high limestone plateau. The distance from the Bulgarian capital, Sofia, is 241.144 km.

Katselovo Center

Katselovo is 18 km south of the UNESCO World Heritage Listed monasteries and churches of Ivanovo and is located on edge of the same steep limestone escarpment. The road from the valley floor (at 120 meters above sea level) to the top of the escarpment (at 260 meters) has many hairpin turns to overcome the 140 meters height difference. In former times it was a hive of economic activity but is now mainly a farming community. The textile factory and other industries having closed down due to the economic difficulties during the headlong rush from socialism to a free market economy after the Bulgarian Communist Party was renamed in 1990.

One of the major employers is the cooperative "Hope - Katselovo" (Bulgarian: ПК "Надежда - Кацелово"), who grow large quantities of wheat, maize and sunflowers. The credit cooperative "Oral" (Bulgarian: Кредитна кооперация “Орало”) continues to play a large part in the village economy as it has done for over 100 years. Most of the residents have large gardens in which they grow vegetables and many keep a cow, goats, sheep or other livestock along with chickens, geese, ducks and turkeys. The fish ponds near the river are used to rear carp for the table.

In 1980 there were 550 houses, 26 of which were empty. 49 houses had only one occupant and 76 houses had two elderly people in. 106 houses had two young people and 293 houses had three or more people living in them. However the population has shrunk considerably in recent years.

Year	1910	1920	1925	1934	1946	1956	1965	1975	1985	1992	2001	2007	2009	2010	2011	2012	2013	2014	2015
Population	1808	1991	2260	2592	2753	2554	2278	2020	1677	1563	1132	943	863	818	792	784	769	694	663

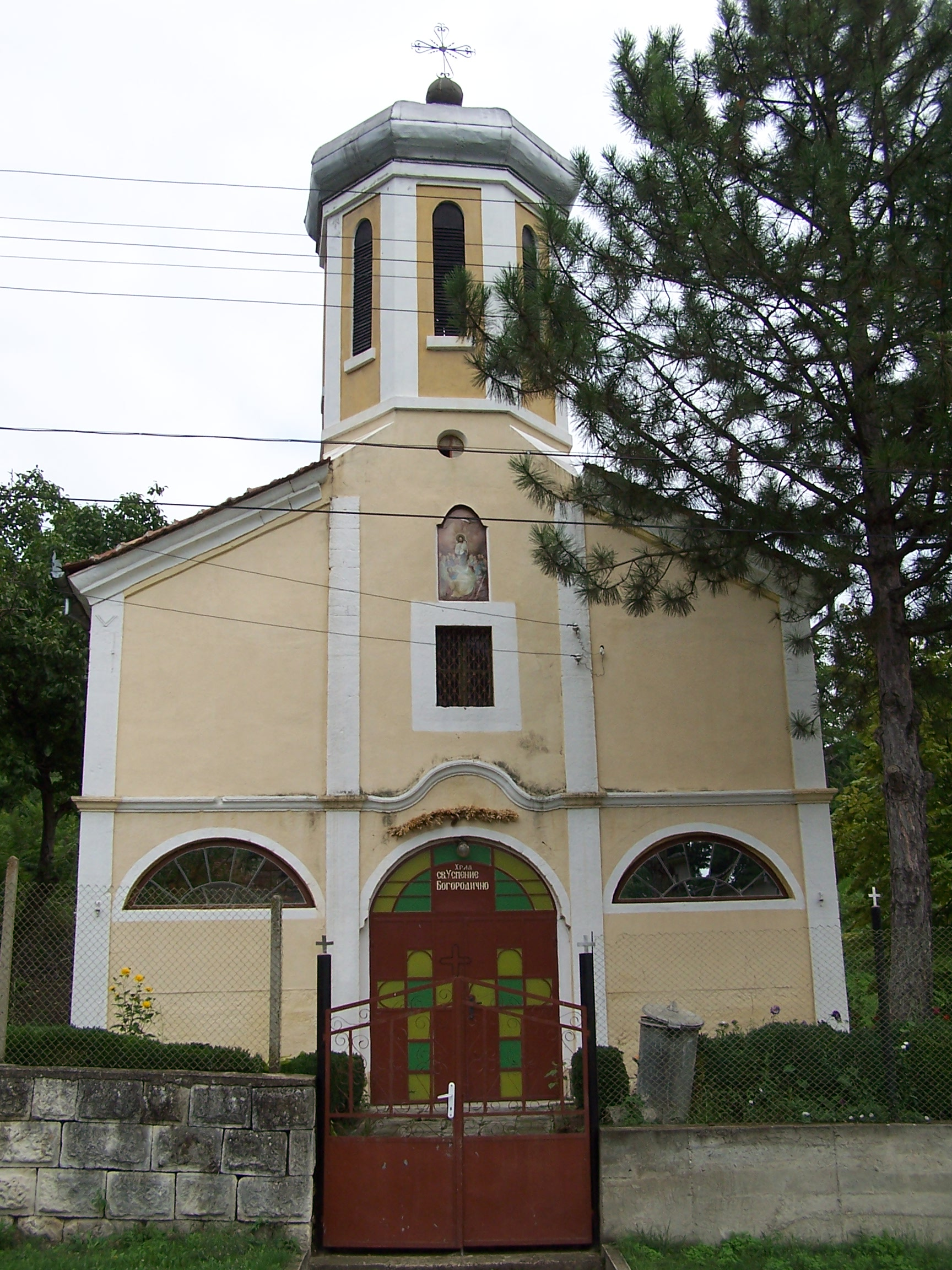
Katselovo Church

== History ==
During Ottoman rule, Katselovo was the largest village in the area and the church there was used for marriages and baptisms. The present church was built in 1862. There are three cemeteries, one of which is from the early Ottoman period and hasn't been used for a few hundred years, the present cemetery is not very old and was a replacement for the previous one which is full. The area around Katselovo is rich in history, there are several neolithic mounds. Roman remains, Macedonian, Thracian, Byzantine and Roman imperial coins have been found nearby too.

On 5 September [O.S. 24 August] 1877, there was a major battle of the Russo-Turkish war of 1877–78 at Katselovo. The Ottoman forces commanded by Mehmed Ali Pasha and Sabit Pasha defeated an army of Russian troops commanded by Crown Prince Alexander Alexandrovich, Major-General Alexei Timofeev, and other commanders. After retreating from Katselovo to Gorsko Ablanovo, another battle occurred, which once again ended in an Ottoman victory.

Eventually the area was liberated from Ottoman control which led to the Treaty of Berlin, which in turn was instrumental in creating the Principality of Bulgaria which, in 1908, officially declared independence and formed the Kingdom of Bulgaria after 512 years of Ottoman rule.

== Modern day ==
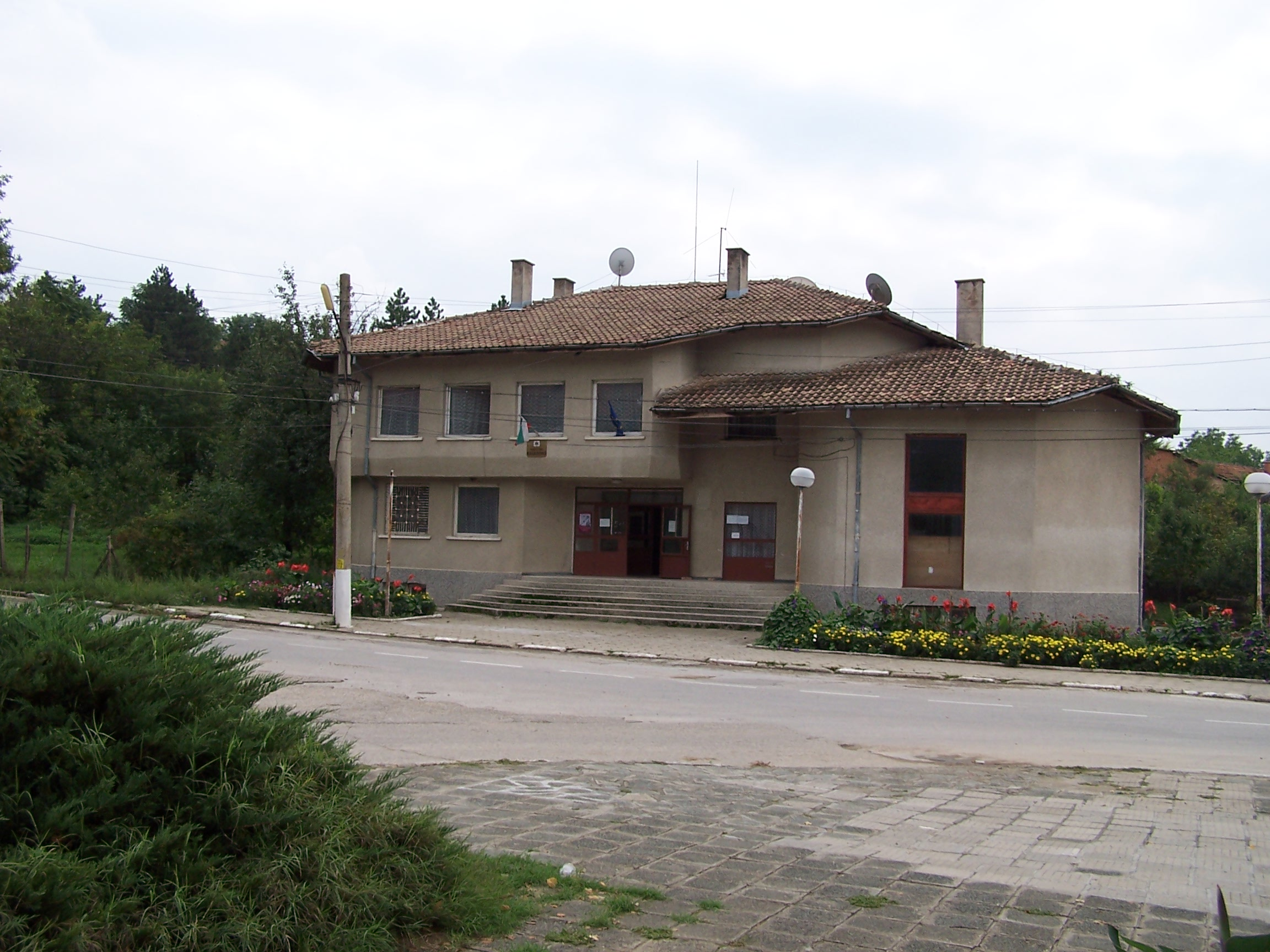
The Mayor's Office

There is a library, cultural center and cinema between the school and the church, opposite the Mayor's office / Town (village) Hall, which itself includes a post office that is opened 3 days per week. Fuel, (petrol, diesel and LPG) is supplied at the filling station (with EasyPay servicepoint) at the top of the hill and at the cooperative Надежда. The town has 4 small shops for daily groceries, which all double as bar, and one of the very few cash machines in the area is in town. The town has a holiday rental nature villa at the top of the mountain, for anybody visiting the town or wanting to explore the region. There is also a British ex-pat community.

The village has a twice daily bus service to Ruse via Dve Mogili. The nearest railway station is at Dve Mogili and the nearest functioning airports are at Varna, (150 km) or Henri Coandă International Airport and Aurel Vlaicu International Airport serving Bucharest across the Danube in Romania, (100 km).

Due to the declining population, the village school was closed down in 2007 and the children now travel by bus to attend school in Dve Mogili. There are several shops and restaurants in the village, along with a post office and a bakery which produces fresh bread six days a week. There is also a street / livestock market on Sundays which is well attended, Katselovo claims to breed the finest horses in the area and are justly proud of this.

In 2002, Stoyan Vitanov (Bulgarian: Стоян Витанов) wrote a very interesting book about Katselovo, entitled Village Katselovo (Bulgarian: Село Кацелово), detailing the history of the village. It tells of the village's involvement in the struggle for independence at the end of the 19th century, the forming of the first cooperatives and their subsequent evolution, how the village held several records in former times for its agricultural production and other interesting facts about Katselovo. It also contains some photographs of the village from the recent past but unfortunately for English readers this has only been published in Bulgarian.

The climate is temperate, with cold snowy winters and hot dry summers.
