= Vladimir Alftan =

Russian general (1860–1940)

Vladimir Alekseyevich Alftan
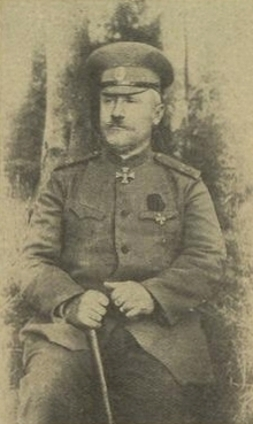
- Born: 29 April [O.S. 17 April] 1860 Bezhetsk, Russian Empire
- Died: 19 December 1940 (aged 80) Helsinki, Finland
- Allegiance: Russian Empire
- Branch: Imperial Russian Army
- Rank: Lieutenant General
- Commands: 113th Starorus Russian Infantry Regiment; 1st Brigade, 12th Infantry Division (Russian Empire)
- Conflicts: World War I; Battle for Height 958

Vladimir (Karl Johan Woldemar) Alekseyevich Alftan Russian: Владимир Алексеевич Альфтан; 29 April [O.S. 17 April] 1860 – 19 December 1940) was a lieutenant general of the Imperial Russian Army, military orientalist, and researcher of Korea.

== Biography ==
Lutheran religion. From the nobles of the Moscow Governorate of Finnish origin; his father was lieutenant general (since 1878) Alexei Karlovich Alftan (1814–1885). He received general education in the Finnish Cadet Corps.

He entered service on 1 September 1879, with a rank cadet at the Nikolayev Cavalry School. On 8 August 1881, he was released as a cornet in the Life Guards of Ulan by His Majesty's Regiment. On 8 August 1885, he was promoted lieutenant.

In 1889, he graduated from the Nikolayev Academy of the General Staff in the 1st category. On 10 April 1889, he was promoted to headquarters captain of the guard with renaming as captain of the General Staff.

From 1 July 1890, he was to the Moscow Military District, he was then Senior Adjutant to the Headquarters of the 13th Army Corps.

From 2 November 1891, to 2 November 1892, the squadron qualified command passed on to the 3rd Dragoon Sumy regiment.

Since 5 April 1893, he has been the headquarters officer for errands under the command of the troops of the South Ussuri department. He was promoted colonel 30 August 1893.

Since 6 March 1895, he served as Senior Adjutant to the Chancellery under the Military Governor of Primorsky Krai. From December 1895 to January 1896, he carried out a reconnaissance trip to the northern provinces of Korea.

Since 28 October 1896, he was Senior Adjutant to the Headquarters of the Amur Military District. On 13 April 1897, he was promoted to colonel. Since 21 September 1897, he was headquarters officer in command of the 66th Infantry Reserve Brigade. From 1 April to 1 October 1900, he was seconded to the 45th Dragoon Seversky Regiment to familiarize himself with the general requirements of management and farming in the cavalry regiment.

From 20 May to 20 September 1903, he passed the qualified command of the battalion in the 16th Grenadier Mingrel regiment, and on 13 December 1903 was appointed commander of the 113th Starorus Russian Infantry Regiment.

Since 3 January – commander of the 77th Tenginsky Infantry Regiment. 6 December 1905, promoted to major general. Since 12 November 1905 - General for Special Assignments under the Commander-in-Chief of the Caucasian Military District.

Since 1 December 1906 – the commandant of the Mikhailovsky fortress.

He was appointed military governor of the Dagestan region in June 1907. He resigned from the position 8 May 1908.

31 July 1909, he returned from retirement with the appointment of the commander of the 1st Brigade of the 12th Infantry Division. On 9 May 1914, he was appointed commander of the 1st Brigade of the 42nd Infantry Division.

Since 19 July 1914 – commander of the 78th Infantry Division. In January 1915 he was promoted to lieutenant general. From 3 June 1915 - the commander of the 12th Army Corps (Russian Empire), from 5 July 1915 – the commander of the 65th Infantry Division (Russian Empire), and from 22 August 1915 - the commander of the 3rd Army Corps (Russian Empire).

He was dismissed from service with uniform and pension 16 April 1917 due to illness. After his dismissal, he was promoted to general of infantry with seniority from 1916. After 1917 he lived in the Kursk Oblast. In 1919 he was arrested by the Bolsheviks. Released after the occupation of Kursk by the troops of the FYUR. After the retreat, VSYUR ended up in Pyatigorsk. In 1922 he came to Petrograd, and later to Moscow.

In May 1923, together with his youngest son George, he left for Finland, where he was later the head of the ROVS department and chairman of the Union of Russian Military Disabled People. He died on 19 December 1940 in Helsinki.

== Awards ==
- Order of St. Stanislav 3rd Class (1892)
- Order of St. Anna, 3rd Class (1895)
- Order of St. Stanislav 2nd Class (1901)
- Order of St. Anna, 2nd Class (1905)
- Order of St. Vladimir 3rd Class (1907)
- Order of St. Stanislav, 1st Class (12/06, 1911)
- Order of St. George, 4th Class (VP 03.02, 1915)

“For the fact that in the battle of 13 August and 14, 1914 at the station Krasne, personally managing the division entrusted to him, occupying the middle combat section of the corps, being constantly under strong enemy fire, showed excellent courage, orderliness and impulse, which resulted in the defeat of the strongly opposed enemy and the capture of 25 enemy guns, 45 charging boxes, a lot of hand weapons, cartridges, outfits and captivity of eight officers and over 500 Austrian soldiers. "

- Order of St. George 3rd degree (VP 13 March 1915)

“Because, being the head of the 78th Infantry Division, he pushed the enemy’s superior forces far deeper into the Carpathian Mountains and, commanding the Stryi detachment consisting of 5 infantry and 4 Cossack regiments, occupied the Carpathian passes in the direction by 10 January 1915 Stryi - Munkach, at the front Pudpoloch - Yablonovo - Maidanka. By this time, the enemy concentrated on this front about three German and two Austrian divisions, with which he went on a decisive offensive. However, General Alftan in stubborn battles on the whole front, personally leading the detachment’s actions, for sixteen days restrained the pressure of the superior enemy forces, and the detachment, due to its advanced position, had unsecured flanks. Departing under the pressure of the strongest enemy and stubbornly lingering on the opposing positions, General Alftan gave them the opportunity to concentrate sufficient forces to finally delay the further advance of the enemy and thereby preserve the northern part of the Carpathians. "

- St. George's Arms (VP 11.04, 1915)

“Because in the battles near Rava-Russian from 24 August to 30 1914 he took a number of positions ahead of Rava-Russian from the battle, covering the left flank of the enemy’s main position, which contributed to the overall success of the corps operation.

== Works ==
- Alftan V.A. General outline of the movement of 5 hunting teams of the 2nd V.-Sib. rifle brigade during an expedition to explore the Ussuri Territory in the summer of 1894. - Khabarovsk, 1895. - 40 p. - (Addendum to No. 77–82 “Amur. Vedomosti” for 1895).
- Alftan V. A. Trip to Korea Gene. PCS. The regiment. Alftana in December 1895 and January 1896 // Collection of geographical, topographic and statistical materials on Asia. - Vol. 69. - S. 8-96.

== Family ==
- Wife - Sofya Dmitrievna (in the name of Mavrokordato; 1880 - June 1917, Odessa), was the daughter of the Greek general Dmitry Georgievich Mavrokordato (1849 -?) and Maria Evangelievna (in the name of Balthage; 1860 -?); Married to V.A. Alftan since 1909.
  - Son - Alexey (1910-1921), left Russia in 1920 with the cadet corps. He died in a camp in Slovenia.
  - Son - Vladimir / Voldemar (1912-1969), left Russia in 1920 with the cadet corps. In 1926 he moved to Finland. Children: Georg (born 1945) and Henrik (born 1955).
  - Son - George (1913-1943), in May 1923 he left with his father in Finland.

Preceded by Viktor Zykov	Commander of the 113th Infantry Regiment; 13 December 1903 – 1904	Succeeded by
Preceded by Alexander Stepanovich Chizh	Commander of the 12th Infantry Division; 1909–1914	Succeeded by Mikhail Ivanovich Troitsky
