= Mikhail Ostrovsky =

Mikhail Ostrovsky may refer to:

- Mikhail Nikolayevich Ostrovsky (1827–1901), Russian statesman
- Mikhail Ostrovsky (diplomat), commissar and Soviet minister to Bucharest, victim of Stalin's purges
