= Mining Department =

Mining Department can refer to:

- Mine Design Department, of the British Royal Navy
- Mining Department (AFL), American labor union organization
- Ministry of Mining Department (Maharashtra), Indian government ministry
- Department of Mining, of the Russian Empire
