= Gorsko Ablanovo =

Gorsko Ablanovo Горско Абланово
- Location of Gorsko Ablanovo
- Coordinates: 43°30.0′N 26°4.6′E
- Country: Bulgaria

Population (2015)
  - Total: 352
- Time zone: UTC+2 (EET)
  - Summer (DST): UTC+3 (EEST)
- Postal code: 7847
- Area code: 060374

Gorsko Ablanovo (Bulgarian: Горско Абланово) is a village in northern Bulgaria. It is in Opaka Municipality in Targovishte Province.

== Population ==
Gorsko Ablanovo has suffered from the general population decline that has affected the whole country.

Year	2010	2015
Population	498	352

== History ==
On 5 September [O.S. 24 August] 1877, there was a major battle of the Russo-Turkish war of 1877–78 at Katselovo. The Ottoman forces commanded by Mehmed Ali Pasha and Sabit Pasha defeated an army of Russian troops commanded by Crown Prince Alexander Alexandrovich, Major-General Alexei Timofeev, and other commanders. After retreating from Katselovo to Gorsko Ablanovo, another battle occurred, which once again ended in an Ottoman victory.

Eventually the area was liberated from Ottoman control which led to the Treaty of Berlin, which in turn was instrumental in creating the Principality of Bulgaria which, in 1908, officially declared independence and formed the Kingdom of Bulgaria after 512 years of Ottoman rule.

Today the area around Gorsko Ablanovo is a mixture of forests and farmland, the climate is temperate, with cold snowy winters and hot dry summers.
