= 33rd Infantry Division (Russian Empire) =

Russian Imperial Army

- 33-я пехотная дивизия
- Active: 1863–1918
- Country: Russian Empire
- Branch: Russian Imperial Army
- Role: Infantry
- Size: approx. 20,000
- Garrison/HQ: Kiev

The 33rd Infantry Division (Russian: 33-я пехо́тная диви́зия, 33-ya pekhotnaya diviziya) was an infantry formation of the Russian Imperial Army. By the outbreak of World War I, it was part of the 21st Army Corps in the Kiev Military District. It was originally formed on 13 August 1863 by an order of the Minister of War that established 12 new infantry divisions (23rd to 34th). After the 1917 Russian Revolution and the declaration of independence by Ukraine, the 33rd Infantry Division became the basis for the formation of the Ukrainian People's Army 14th Infantry Division.

== Organization ==
Russian infantry divisions consisted of a staff, two infantry brigades, and one artillery brigade.

- 1st Brigade
  - 129th Bessarabia Infantry Regiment
  - 130th Kherson Infantry Regiment
- 2nd Brigade
  - 131st Tiraspol Infantry Regiment
  - 132nd Bendersky Infantry Regiment
- 33rd Artillery Brigade

== Commanders ==
- 1871-1876: Pyotr Vannovskiy

== Commanders of the 2nd Brigade ==
- 1878: Dmitrij Petrovich Dohturov
