= Viktor Zykov =

Lieutenant General

Viktor Pavlovich Zykov
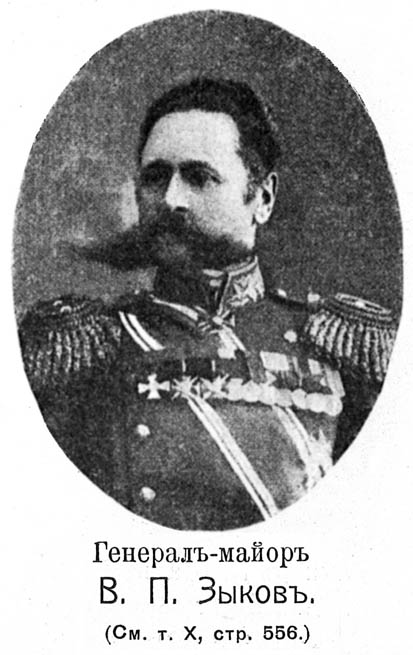
- Born: 19 September 1854
- Died: Unknown
- Allegiance: Russian Empire
- Branch: Imperial Russian Army
- Rank: lieutenant general
- Commands: 113th Starorus Russian Infantry Regiment
- Conflicts: Serbian-Turkish Wars; Russo-Turkish War; Russo-Japanese War; Russian Civil War

Viktor Pavlovich Zykov (19 September 1854 — not earlier than 1923) was a lieutenant general, and a participant in the Russo-Turkish War (1877-78) and Russo-Japanese War.

== Biography ==
Victor Zykov was born on 19 September 1854. He was educated in the Saratov Classical Gymnasium and the Kazan Infantry Junker School.

In 1875 he was promoted to ensign in the 158th Kutaisi Infantry Regiment. In 1876, he volunteered to participate in the Serbian–Turkish Wars (1876–1878), then returned to his regiment, with which he took part in the Russo-Turkish War (1877-78). and during the night assault on Kars Fort, Haft-Pasha-Tabiya Zykov was shell-shocked. On 19 April 1878 for the distinction near Kars, he was awarded the Order of St. George 4th degree:

"In retribution for the difference made in the case with the Turks near Kars, on 24 October 1877, when taking the fortification of Hafiz-Pasha-Tabiya, where, commanding the company, the first rushed to the fortification bastion, carried the soldiers behind him and, despite the stubborn resistance of the Turks, knocked them out from the bastion and took possession of the instrument."

Conducted in 1896 as colonel, Zykov was then Chistopol district military commander, commanded the 243rd Zlatoust reserve battalion and the 113th Starorus Russian Infantry Regiment.

In 1903, Viktor Pavlovich Zykov was promoted to major general with the appointment of the commander of the 2nd brigade of the 9th East Siberian Rifle Division; in this position, he took part in the war with Japan and for distinction was awarded the Order of St. Stanislav 1st degree with swords.

In 1905, Zykov was appointed commander of the 2nd Brigade of the 7th Infantry Division (Russian Empire), in 1908 - commander of the 1st Brigade of the 29th Infantry Division (Russian Empire); from October of that year he was the head of the 6th, and from 1910 the 5th Turkestan brigade. On 5 April 1914, he was dismissed with production as lieutenant general, with uniform and pension.

In the Civil War he took part on the side of the Whites, but was captured by the Red Army. The last reliable mention of Zykov dates back to 1923: it is known that he was listed in the Red Army and was in Moscow for military teaching.

== Awards ==
- Order of St. Anna, 4th degree with the inscription "For courage" (1877)
- Order of St. George 4th Class (April 19, 1878)
- Order of St. Vladimir 4th degree with swords and bow (1878)
- Order of St. Anna, 3rd degree with swords and bow (1879)
- Order of St. Stanislav, 2nd art. (1902)
- Order of St. Vladimir 3rd degree with swords (1904)
- Order of St. Stanislav 1st degree with swords (1905)
- Order of St. Anna 1st Class (1909)

Military offices
Preceded by	Commander of the 113th Starorus Russian Infantry Regiment; 1900-1903	Succeeded by Vladimir Alekseyevich Alftan

== Sources ==
- Зыков, Виктор Павлович // Военная энциклопедия : [в 18 т.] / под ред. В. Ф. Новицкого ... [и других: К. И. Величко, А. В. фон-Шварца, В. А. Апушкина, Г. К. фон-Шульца]. — СПб. ; [М.] : Тип. т-ва И. Д. Сытина, 1911—1915.
- Volkov S.V. Generality of the Russian Empire. Encyclopedic dictionary of generals and admirals from Peter I to Nicholas II. Volume I. AK. - M .: CJSC Centerpolygraph, 2009. - S. 562. - ISBN 978-5-9524-4166-8
- List to the generals by seniority. Done on January 1, 1913. - SPb., 1913. - S. 395.
