= Foresters' Corps =

- Active: 30 January 1839 – 1918
- Country: Russian Empire
- Branch: Imperial Russian Army; Ministry of State Property (from 1869)
- Type: Corps
- Role: Protection of government-owned forests

The Foresters' Corps (Russian: Корпус лесничих) was a special corps in the Land Forces of the Russian Empire, and from 1869, part of the Forests Department of the Ministry of State Property.

The Foresters' Corps was officially created on 30 January 1839. During its formation, it received a military function. It consisted of two parts, the military part being subject to the Imperial Russian Army, and the civilian part being under the Ministry of Finance's Forests Department.

The commander of the corps (who had the rank of General) was called the Inspector of the Foresters' Corps. Under his control were governoral forest administrations and forest battle-schools. The head of the governorate forest administration was the Governoral Forester (with a rank from Major to Colonel). He was equal in rights and rank to an Army infantry Regiment Commander. Regional Foresters and the Governorate Guard fell under their jurisdiction. The District Forester (rank from Staff Captain to Major), under whose jurisdiction fell the Forest Guard of the Okrug (District), had rights equal to a Battalion Commander. Some governorates were not divided into Forest Districts (Okrugs), and the Forest Guard were commanded directly by the Governoral Forester.

Because the Foresters' Corps was considered part of the military, members of all ranks carried regular firearms. Foresters' Corps members continued to carry standard-issued weapons after 1869, when the Corps was officially transferred from the Imperial Army to the Ministry of State Property, thus becoming a "Militarized division"

On 2 August 1867, a "project on temporary rules regarding the transformation, from military to civilian function, of the Railroad, Forest and Boundary Corps," was published. Later, in accordance with the project, the military ranks of the Foresters' Corps received civilian names, determined by the Table of Ranks. The titles of Inspector of the Foresters' Corps (4th-class), Vice-Inspector of the Foresters' Corps (5th class), Forester (9th class), etc. were added to the Table.
