= Vladimir Olderogge =

Russian and Soviet military leader

Vladimir Alexandrovich Olderogge
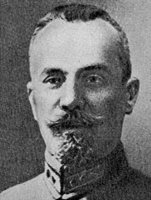
- Born: August 5, 1873; Lublin, Russian Empire
- Died: May 27, 1931 (aged 57) Kharkov, Soviet Union
- Allegiance: Russian Empire; Soviet Union
- Branch: Imperial Russian Army; Soviet Red Army
- Rank: major general (Russian Empire)
- Commands: 113th Starorus Russian Infantry Regiment; 1st Turkestan Rifle Division; Eastern Front (RSFSR)
- Conflicts: Russo-Japanese War; World War I; Russian Civil War; Great Siberian Ice March

Vladimir Alexandrovich Olderogge (August 5, 1873 – May 27, 1931) was a Russian and Soviet military leader. He was commander of the Eastern Front of the Red Army.

== Biography ==
Olderogge was born on July 24 (August 5), 1873, in Lublin to a Lutheran family. He was a descendant of a Danish officer who entered the Russian service under Peter the Great.

He graduated from the First Cadet Corps (1890) and the 2nd Military Konstantinovsky School (1894), from where he was released as second lieutenant to the 29th Chernigov Infantry Regiment. The Finnish Regiment was later transferred to the Life Guards. In 1901, he graduated from the Nikolaev Academy of the General Staff in the first category, then was a member of the Kiev Military District. Since November 26, 1901, he was a senior adjutant to the headquarters of the 2nd combined Cossack division. The censored command of the company from October 25, 1902, to October 25, 1903, served in the 74th Infantry Regiment of Stavropol.

He took part in the Russo-Japanese War. From October 31, 1904, he was head of the road department of the military-district military communications department of the theater of war of the Manchurian army, and from August 4, 1906, he was head of the combat department of the Sevastopol Fortress. From May 23 to September 23, 1907, he served the qualification command of a battalion in the 49th Brest Infantry Regiment. From December 4, 1907, Olderogge was the head of troop movements on the railway and waterways of the Irkutsk region, from February 7, 1908, the head of the combat department of the Sveaborg fortress, and from November 2, 1908, was the head of troop movements on the railway and waterways of the Omsk region. From April 5, 1912, he was in the 5th Siberian Rifle Regiment, from May 16, 1912—in the 110th Kama Infantry Regiment, and from January 28, 1914—in the 113th Starorus Russian Infantry Regiment.

== World War I ==
In August 1914, Olderogge took part in a campaign in East Prussia and the Battle of Gumbinnen. From October 27, 1914, he commanded the Old Russian 113th Infantry Regiment. He took part in the battles of the 20th Army Corps during the August operation in which the corps was surrounded. Olderogge made his way out of the encirclement at the forefront of the corps (113th and 114th infantry regiments). From March 12, 1916, he commanded the brigade of the 1st Turkestan Rifle Division, and from July 7, 1917, the 1st Turkestan Rifle Division.

== Civil War ==
In the spring of 1918, Olderogge voluntarily joined the Red Army. Voenruk (military commander) of the Novorzhevsky section of the Curtain forces.

He commanded the Novorzhevsk (later Pskov and Lithuanian) infantry division. At the head of this division, Olderogge participated in battles with Polish, Russian troops and with the national armies of the Baltic states on the territory of Belarus, Lithuania and Latvia.

For one month he was the chief of staff of the Eastern Front, after which he was at the disposal of the RCF of the Eastern Front. On August 15, 1919, he commanded the Eastern Front of the Red Army, replacing Mikhail Frunze at this post. In this post, he defeated Kolchak’s troops in Western Siberia. After the dissolution on January 15, 1920, the Eastern Front was headed by the West Siberian Military District.

From October 25, 1920, he was for special assignments under the commander of the Southern Front M.V. Frunze. One of the planners of the Perekop-Chongar operation.

““ The legendary Bolshevik leader M.V. Frunze was appointed the official commander of the Southern Front on September 21 [1920]. In reality, the operation of capturing the Crimea was developed by the chief of staff of the front, former lieutenant colonel of the General Staff I.X. Spider and assistant Frunze, former Major General of the General Staff V.A. Olderogge. By that time, on the account of the commander of the Eastern Front, V. A. Olderogge in 1919 was the defeat of the armies of Kolchak, and I. Kh. Spider managed to distinguish himself in the first half of 1920 as commander 13. "

== Post-war career ==
From January 18, 1921, he was an inspector of infantry and commander of the troops of Ukraine and Crimea, and from June 1, 1921, he was chief inspector of the Military Educational Institutions of the Kiev Military Region. Inspector of the University of the Red Army. Since 1922, he was an assistant to the head of the Military Scientific Society, then renamed Osoaviahim.

Since February 1924 he was the head (later assistant chief) of the Kamenev Joint School. Military instructor of the Kiev Polytechnic Institute, then the chief military instructor of Kiev.

Vladimir Olderogge was arrested on December 7, 1930, as part of the Vesna Case. During the investigation, he admitted that he was the head of the counter-revolutionary officer organization in Ukraine. Sentence of the Military College of the OGPU of May 20, 1931, under Art. 58 pp. 2, 11 sentenced to capital punishment. Shot on May 27, 1931, in Kharkov.

By decision of the Military Tribunal of the Kiev Military District of April 30, 1974, the case for the lack of corpus delicti was dismissed and Olderogge was posthumously rehabilitated.

== Ranks ==
- Second Lieutenant (Art. 04.08, 1892).
- Lieutenant (Art. 04.08, 1896).
- Headquarters Captain of the Guard (st. 08/08, 1900)
- captain of the General Staff (st. 08/04, 1900).
- Lieutenant Colonel (Art. 06.12, 1904).
- Colonel (Art. 06.12, 1908).
- Major General (Art. 06.02, 1915).

== Awards ==
- Order of St. Stanislav 3rd Art. (1903);
- Order of St. Anna, 3rd class (1906);
- Order of St. Stanislav 2nd degree (1907).
- Order of St. Anna, 2nd degree (VP June 6, 1914)
- St. George's weapons (October 13, 1914)
- Order of St. Vladimir, 4th degree with swords and bow (VP February 26, 1915)
- Order of St. Vladimir 3rd degree with swords (VP July 17, 1915)
- Order of St. Stanislav 1st degree with swords (VP January 16, 1916)
- Order of St. Anna, 1st degree with swords (VP 07.01, 1917)
- swords for the Order of St. Anna, 2nd degree (02/07, 1917)
- Order of the Red Banner (December 19, 1919)

== Sources ==
- Olderogge, Vladimir Alexandrovich. // Project "Russian Army in the Great War".
- Kavtaradze A.G. Commander of the Eastern Front (V.A. Olderogge) // Military History Journal. 1981, No. 7.
- Military Encyclopedic Dictionary / Ch. ed. Komis: N.V. Ogarkov et al. - M., 1983.
- Civil war and military intervention in the USSR: Encycl. / Ch. ed. S. S. Khromov. - M., 1987.
- Kavtaradze A. G, Military Specialists in the Service of the Republic of Soviets. 1917-1920 - M., 1988.
- Kakurin N. E., How the revolution fought. T. 2. 1919-1920. - M., 1990.
- Tinchenko Y. Yu., Golgotha Russian officers in the USSR. 1930–1931 years. - M., 2000.
- Olderogge Vladimir Alexandrovich // Military Encyclopedia / Grachev P. S. . - Moscow: Military Publishing House, 2002. - V. 6. - P. 54. - ISBN 5-203-01873-1.

Military offices
Preceded by	Commander of the 113th Starorus Russian Infantry Regiment; October 27, 1914 - 1916	Succeeded by
Preceded by	Commander of the Eastern Front (RSFSR); August 15, 1919 - January 15, 1920	Succeeded by front disbanded
