= 113th Infantry Regiment (Russian Empire) =

113th Starorus Russian Infantry Regiment
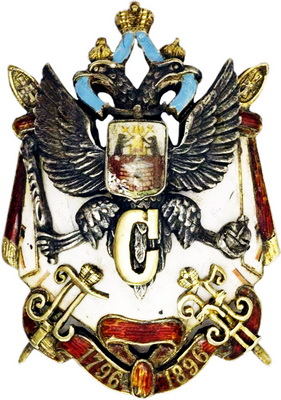
- Badge of the Regiment
- Active: 1796 – c. 1918
- Country: Russian Empire
- Branch: Russian Imperial Army
- Role: Infantry
- Engagements: Patriotic War of 1812; Battle of Ostrovno; Battle of Tarutino; Battle of Vyazma; War of the Sixth Coalition; Battle of Leipzig; Battle of Paris (1814); Crimean War; World War I

The 113th Infantry Starorussky Regiment was an infantry military unit of the Russian Imperial Army.

Regimental holiday was May 9.

Seniority – from November 29, 1796.

== Locations ==
In 1820, the Rylsky infantry regiment from Babruysk was transferred to the settlement of Klimov, Novozybkovsky district. The second battalion of the regiment in a settlement in the Mogilev province. It was part of the 1st Brigade, 29th Infantry Division (Russian Empire).

== Formation and Campaign Regiment ==
=== Regiment predecessors ===
The predecessor of the Starorussky regiment is the former Rylsky infantry regiment, formed on November 29, 1796 in Orenburg. During the Patriotic War of 1812, the old Rylsky regiment defended Dinaburg, then took part in the Battle of Ostrovno, on Valutin Hill, Borodino, Battle of Tarutino and Battle of Vyazma. In the War of the Sixth Coalition (1813 – 1814), the Rylsky regiment fought in the Battle of Leipzig (1813) and stormed the Montmartre Heights at the Battle of Paris (1814).

On January 9, 1798, 10 banners of the 1797 model were granted to the Rila Musketeer Regiment. One had a white cross, and the corners were green with a dark blue in half. The rest have a green cross, and the corners are dark blue. Coffee poles. In 1824, the Rylsky Infantry Regiment was granted a simple (without inscriptions) banner of the 1816 model. The cross is green, the corners are white.

On January 28, 1833, the old Rylsky Infantry Regiment was disbanded and its battalions became part of the Chernihiv Infantry Regiment, making up the 3rd and 4th active and 6th reserve battalions. In 1849, the Chernihiv regiment was in the Hungarian campaign, and during the Crimean War was part of the troops besieging Silistria. At the end of 1854, the Chernigov regiment was moved to strengthen troops in the Crimea and was in Sevastopol until the very end of the siege of the city by the English-French.

=== Old Russian Regiment ===
The Starorussky regiment was formed on April 6, 1863 in Novozybkov from the 4th reserve battalion of the Chernigov infantry regiment under the name of the Chernihiv reserve infantry regiment, and on August 13 of the same year was named the Starorussian infantry regiment, on March 25, 1864 the regiment was given the number 113. The regiment inherited the insignia of Chernihiv .

On March 18, 1884, seniority was established for the Old Russian Infantry Regiment from November 29, 1796, that is, since the formation of the old Rylsky Regiment. On November 29, 1896, on the centennial day, the regiment was granted the new St. George banner with the Alexander ribbon. On November 29, 1896, a banner was presented to a regiment in the Lithuanian city of Šauliai.

During World War I, the regiment fought in East Prussia and in February 1915 was surrounded and was almost completely destroyed along with the 20th Army Corps (Russian Empire).

== Regiment insignia ==
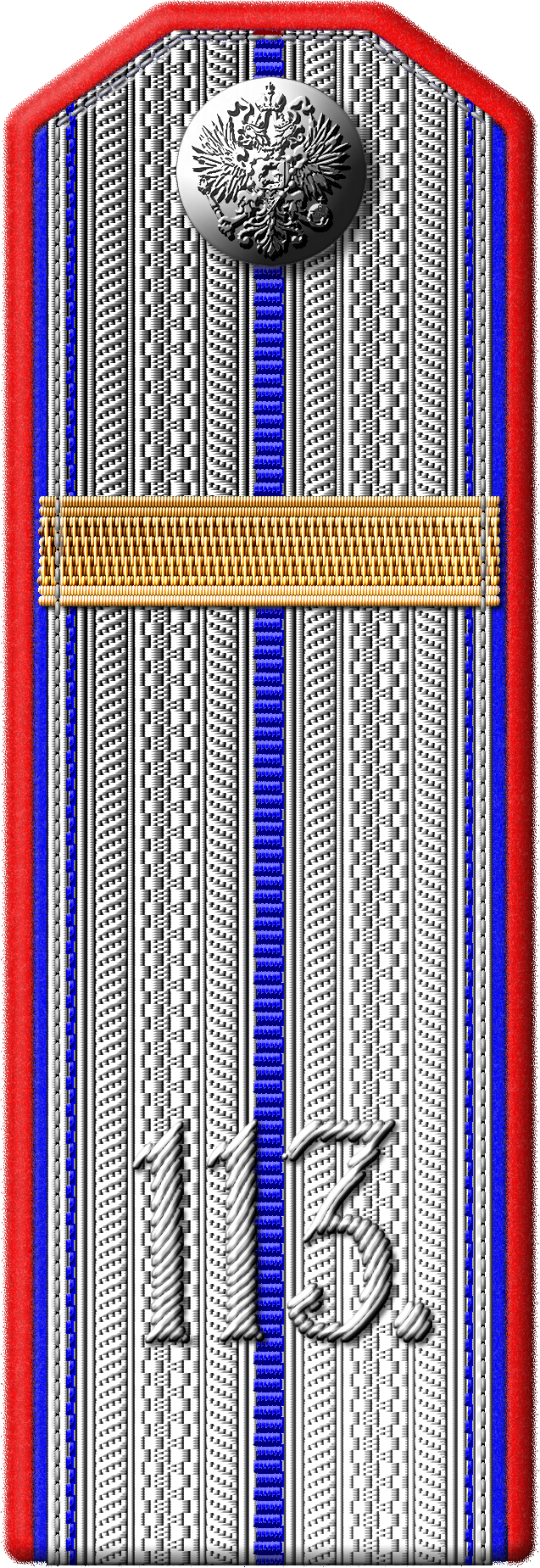
regiment (epaulettes of the 1914 model)

- The regimental St. George flag with the inscriptions "For Sevastopol in 1854 and 1855" and "1796-1896" with the Alexander anniversary ribbon. Complained on November 29, 1896.
- Signs on hats for the lower ranks with the inscription "For Distinction" granted in 1833 to the battalions of the old Rylsky regiment for the equation with the battalions of the Chernigov regiment.

== Chefs of the regiment ==
- September 9, 1797 – May 30, 1798 – Infantry General Baron Iosif Igelström
- May 30, 1798 – July 14, 1803 – Major General Bakhmetiev, Nikolai Nikolayevich
- July 16, 1803 – July 13, 1812 – Major General Modest Matveyevich Okulov

== Regiment commanders ==
=== Old Rylsky Infantry Regiment ===
- 01/02, 1797 – December 29, 1797 – Colonel Vasily Nikolayevich Panov
- December 29, 1797 – May 31, 1798 – Colonel Barykov, Pyotr Alexandrovich
- September 13, 1798 – December 21, 1800 – lieutenant colonel (colonel from October 17, 1799) Semichev, Boris Prokofievich
- 02/08, 1801 – September 24, 1801 – Colonel Freiman, Ivan Karlovich
- 02/04, 1802 – February 24, 1803 – Major Vainyukov, Pavel Semenovich
- April 14, 1803 – May 24, 1804 – Colonel Kalemin, Luka Fomich
- October 4, 1804 – June 19, 1806 – Colonel Prince Urakov, Alexei Vasilyevich
- October 10, 1806 – October 18, 1811 – lieutenant colonel (Colonel from August 30, 1811) Samoilov, Ilya Ivanovich
- 07.1812 – 12.1812 – Colonel Pavel Nikolayevich Ushakov
- 02.1813 – August 22, 1826 – major (from December 16, 1813 lieutenant colonel, from September 15, 1817 colonel) Nekrasov, Nikolai Mikhailovich
- September 16, 1826 – September 29, 1828 – Colonel Fedor Sergeyevich Panyutin
- November 25, 1828 – January 22, 1833 – lieutenant colonel (colonel from 04/09, 1831) Bessonov, Ivan Ivanovich (from January 22, 1833 to 2.04, 1833 he commanded the Chernihiv regiment)

For a list of commanders of the Chernihiv Infantry Regiment, see the related article.

=== Old Russian Infantry Regiment ===
- 04/06, 1863 – April 17, 1870 – Colonel Witte, August Karlovich (from 9.06, 1857 he commanded the Chernihiv regiment)
- April 17, 1870 – 03/02, 1878 – Colonel Izmailsky, Andrei Ivanovich
- March 18, 1878 – March 21, 1888 – Colonel Larionov, Dmitry Ivanovich
- March 27, 1888 – June 21, 1894 – Colonel Fursov, Dmitry Semenovich
- July 2, 1894 – after 02/01, 1899 – Colonel Kraevsky, Mitrofan Dmitrievich
- 07/04, 1900 – November 26, 1903 – Colonel Viktor Pavlovich Zykov
- December 13, 1903 – 01/03, 1904 – Colonel Vladimir Alekseyevich Alftan
- September 17, 1907 – October 30, 1912 – Colonel Leonty Leontyevich Cybort
- December 21, 1912 – August 23, 1914 – Colonel Kalishevich, Nikolai Ivanovich
- October 27, 1914 – until 12.03, 1916 – Colonel (from 6.02, 1915 Major General) Vladimir Olderogge
- July 8, 1917 – August 5, 1917 – Colonel Charnotsky, Felix Eduardovich

== Famous people who served in the regiment ==
- Andres Larka – Estonian political and military leader
- Zagumenny, Alexander Alexandrovich – Russian doctor, doctor of medicine, served as a doctor in the regiment from 1879 to 1881.

== Sources ==
- Gabayev G.S. Mural to Russian regiments of 1812. Kiev, 1912
- Grenadier and infantry regiments. Reference book of the Imperial Headquarters. Under. ed. V.K.Shenk. SPb., 1909 on Runivers website
- Kamensky M.P. The death of the XX Corps on February 8/21, 1915. (According to archival materials of the headquarters of the 10th army). Petersburg, 1921
- Brief Chronicle of the 113th Infantry Starorussky Regiment. Compiled on the occasion of the centenary of the regiment on November 29, 1896, 1796 – November 29, 1896 Riga, 1896
- Mokrinsky G. A. "History of the 113th Infantry Starorus Regiment", St. Petersburg, 1900. on the website of Runivers
- Sologub K.N. (text), Vasiliev K.S. (drawings). Shoulder straps of ordinary military officials of the Russian Imperial Army // Petersburg Collector: Journal. – SPb., 2012. – No. 2 (70). – S. 80-85. – OTRS No. 2019101710006917 (authors). – The publication is licensed under CC BY-SA 3.0 CC BY-SA 3.0.
- Encyclopedia of military and naval sciences. Ed. G. A. Leer. T. VII. SPb., 1895
