= 12th Army Corps (Russian Empire) =

- 12-й армейский корпус
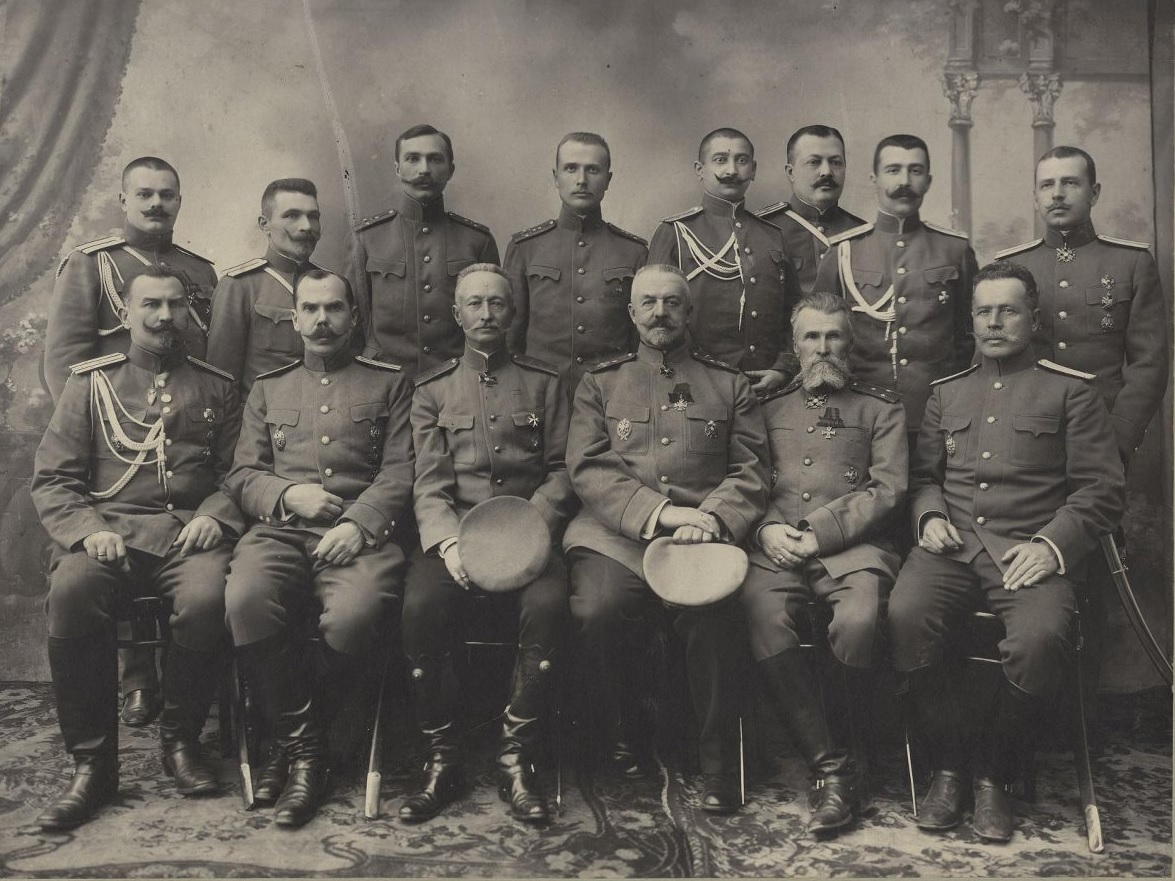
- Headquarters of the 12th Army Corps, 1914
- Active: 1876–1918
- Country: Russian Empire; Russian Republic (from 1917)
- Branch: Imperial Russian Army; Russian Army (from 1917)
- Engagements: World War I; Gorlice–Tarnów Offensive

The 12th Army Corps (Russian: 12-й армейский корпус) was an Army corps in the Imperial Russian Army.

The corps was established on 1 November 1876. The corps was a part of the Kiev Military District and the 7th Army of the Southwestern Front.

== Composition ==
- 12th Infantry Division
- 19th Infantry Division
- 12th Cavalry Division

== Part of ==
- 8th Army: 1914–1915
- 3rd Army: 1915
- 8th Army: 1915
- 9th Army: 1915–1916
- 7th Army: 1916–1917
- 8th Army: 1917
- 7th Army: 1917

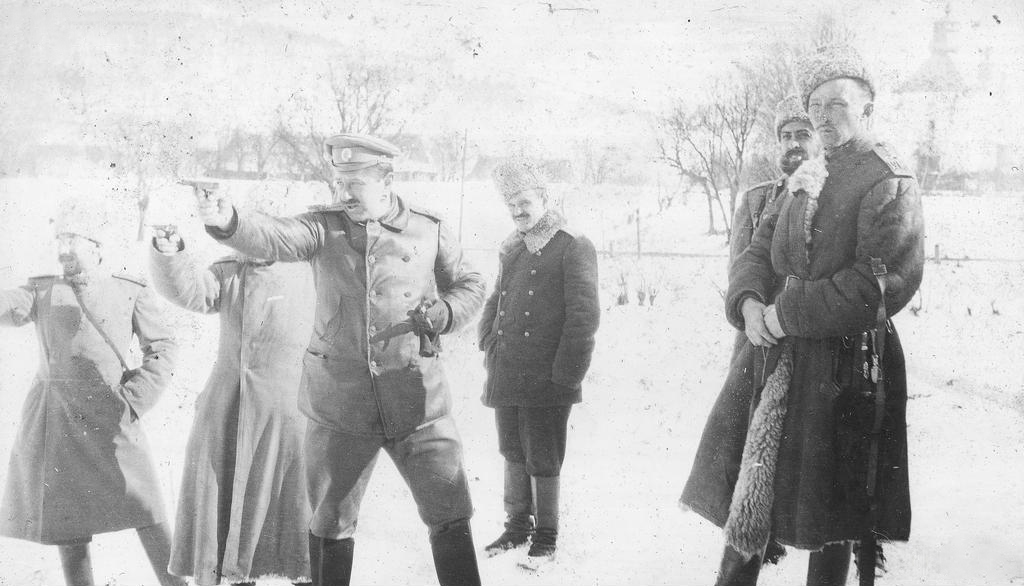
Officers of the 12th Mortar and Artillery Battalion (12th Cavalry Division) firing at targets

== Commanders ==
- 1876–1877: Pyotr Vannovskiy
- 1877–1878: Grand Duke Vladimir Alexandrovich of Russia
- 1879–1881: Pyotr Vannovskiy
- 1893–1896: Mikhail Batyanov
- 1904–1905: Vladimir Alexandrovich Bekman
- 1913–1914: Aleksei Brusilov
- 1914–1915: Leonid Lesh
- 1915: Vladimir Alekseyevich Alftan
