= Battle of Ablanovo =

1877 battle of the Russo-Turkish War

- Part of Russo-Turkish War (1877–1878)
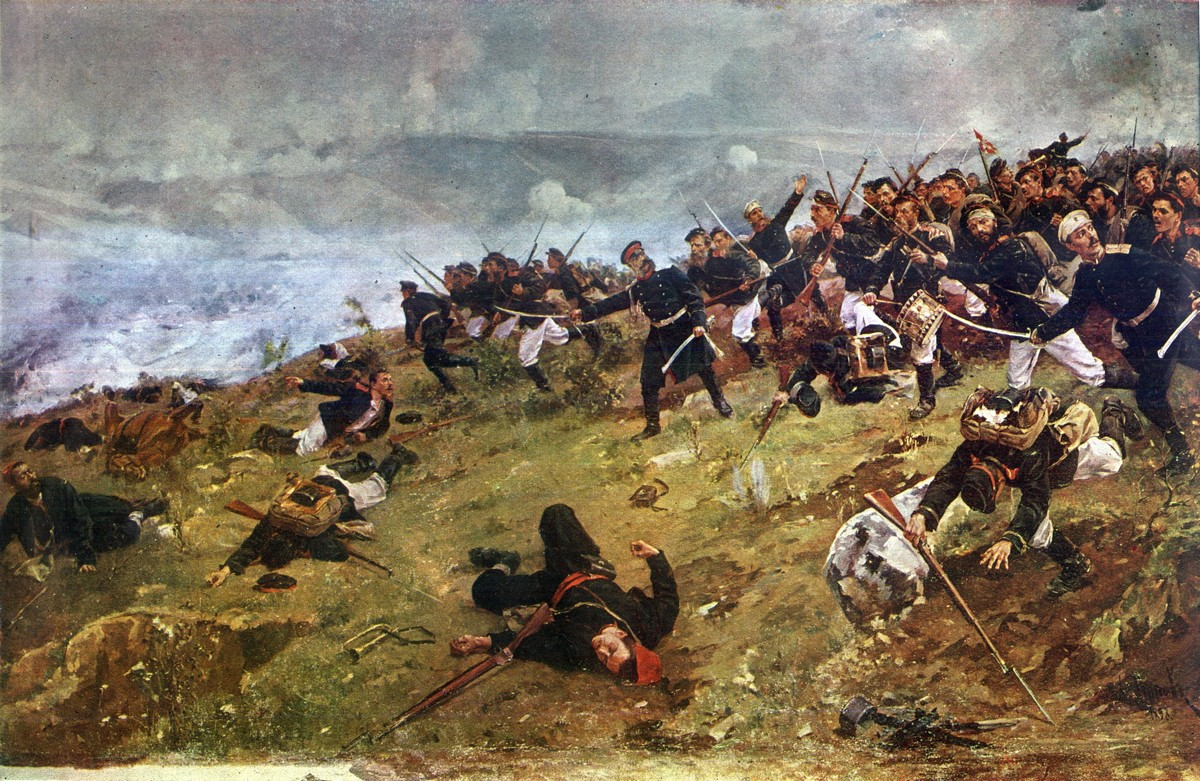
- Battle of Ablanovo
Date	September 5–6, 1877
Location	Gorsko Ablanovo, Ottoman Empire
Result	Ottoman victory

Belligerents
Ottoman Empire	Russian Empire

Commanders and leaders
(Ottoman Empire) Mehmed Ali Pasha	(Russian Empire) Alexander Romanov (Russian Empire) Pyotr Vannovsky (Russian Empire) Sergey Romanov

Strength
Total of Katselovo and Ablanovo: 29,000 soldiers, 60 cannons	Total of Katselovo and Ablanovo: 13,000 soldiers, 54 cannons

Casualties and losses
Total of Katselovo and Ablanovo: 1,700 dead and wounded	Total of Katselovo and Ablanovo: 2,000 dead and wounded (including 56 officers)

The Battle of Ablanovo, also known as the Battle of Gorsko Ablanovo, was a conflict that took place on 5–6 September 1877 near the village of Ablanovo in the Ottoman Empire during the Russo-Turkish War (1877–1878). The battle resulted in an Ottoman victory.

== Battle ==
The Ottoman forces were commanded by Mehmed Ali Pasha, while the Russian army was under the overall command of Tsesarevich Alexander Romanov. Alexander had established his military headquarters in Katselovo. However, he and his army were forced to retreat to Gorsko Ablanovo after being driven out of the village by the Ottomans on 5 September. When the Ottomans reached Ablanovo, a counter-attack was launched under the leadership of Major General Aleksey Timofeev. After intense fighting, the Russian defense collapsed. Following an armistice proposed by Mehmed Ali Pasha on 6 September, the Russians were forced to withdraw their troops to the area around Ruse.

== Bibliography ==
- Bodart, Gaston (1908). Militär-historisches Kriegs–Lexikon (1618–1905) [Historical Military War Dictionary (1618–1905)] (in German). Vienna: C. W. Stern.
- Grzesicki, Wiedstruck (1911). The Russo-Turkish War of 1877-1878 on the Balkan Peninsula (in German). Vienna: L. W. Seidel & Sohn. ISBN 9783747758342.
