= Ruse =

Ruse may refer to:

== Places ==
- Ruse, Bulgaria, a major city of Bulgaria
  - Ruse Municipality
  - Ruse Province
  - 19th MMC – Ruse, a constituency
- Ruše, a town and municipality in north-eastern Slovenia
- Ruše, Žalec, a small settlement in east-central Slovenia
- Ruse, New South Wales, a suburb of Sydney, Australia
- Ruse Peak, Antarctica

== Art and entertainment ==
- Ruse (book), Ruse: Undercover with FBI Counterintelligence, an autobiography by Robert Eringer
- Ruse (comics), a comic book published by CrossGen
- R.U.S.E., a 2010 video game
- "Ruse", a song by Chevelle from Hats Off to the Bull
- The Ruse, indie rock band based in Los Angeles, California

== Education ==
- James Ruse Agricultural High School, a selective high school in Sydney, Australia
- University of Ruse, a public university in Ruse, Bulgaria

== Other uses ==
- Ruse, a deception, an action or plan which is intended to deceive someone, for example a ruse of war
- USS PC-472, a US Navy submarine chaser transferred to the French Navy in 1944 and renamed Le Ruse

== People with the name ==
- Austin Ruse, American nonprofit executive and anti-abortion activist
- Elena-Gabriela Ruse (born 1997), Romanian tennis player
- James Ruse (1759–1857), born in Cornwall, transported to New South Wales
- Michael Ruse (1940–), philosopher of science
