= Department of Mining =

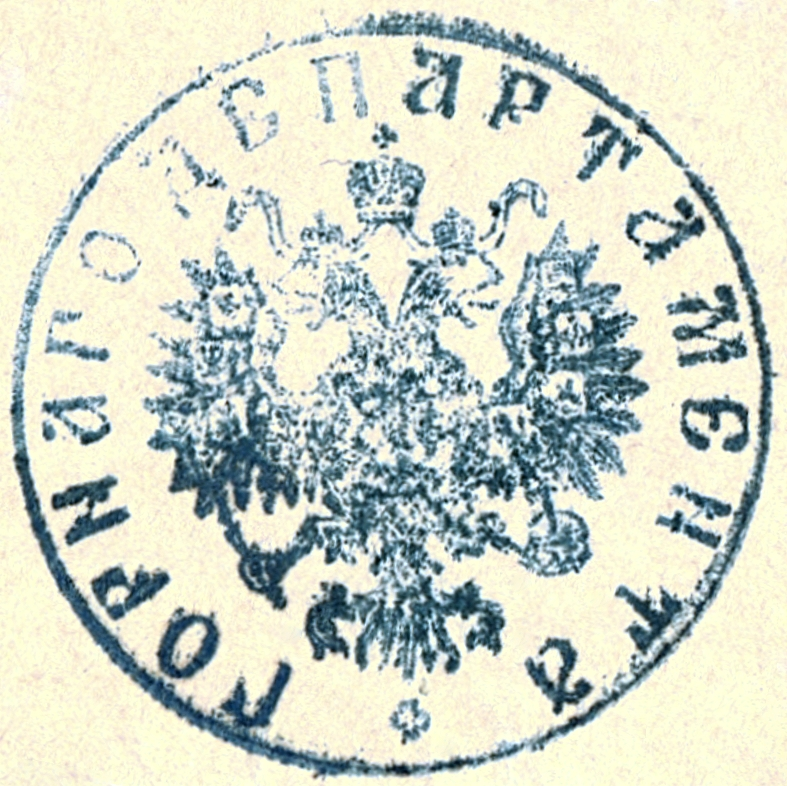
Mining Department seal

The Department of Mining (Russian: Го́рный департа́мент) was the central governing body of the Mining-metallurgical Okrugs of the Russian Empire. These Okrugs, or "regions", were administrative subdivisions of the Empire relating to mining and mountain industry and the regulation thereof. From 1811 to 1863, it was called the Department of Mountain and Salt Matters. Originally part of the Ministry of Finance, it was transferred to the Ministry of State Property in 1875. The department was disestablished in 1918 with the collapse of the Imperial Russian government.

The development of mining capabilities was one of Finance Minister Egor Frantsevich Kankrin's top priorities in the early 19th century. He oversaw many bureaucratic reforms and conflicts that sought to maintain Russia's resource independence and wealth. Nonetheless by the middle of the century, the Russian Empire had lost its competitive advantages in metal production due to the stagnating constraints of the Russian bureaucracy which could not capitalize on forced labor and aging equipment.

== Directors ==
1834 - 1837, Egor Vasil’evich Karneev
