= 78th Infantry Division (Russian Empire) =

- 78-я пехотная дивизия
- Active: 1914–1918
- Country: Russian Empire
- Branch: Russian Imperial Army
- Role: Infantry

The 78th Infantry Division (Russian: 78-я пехотная дивизия, 78-ya Pekhotnaya Diviziya) was an infantry formation of the Russian Imperial Army.

== Organization ==
- 1st Brigade
  - 309th Infantry Regiment
  - 310th Infantry Regiment
- 2nd Brigade
  - 311th Infantry Regiment
  - 312th Infantry Regiment
