= Battle of Katselovo =

- Part of Russo-Turkish War (1877–1878)
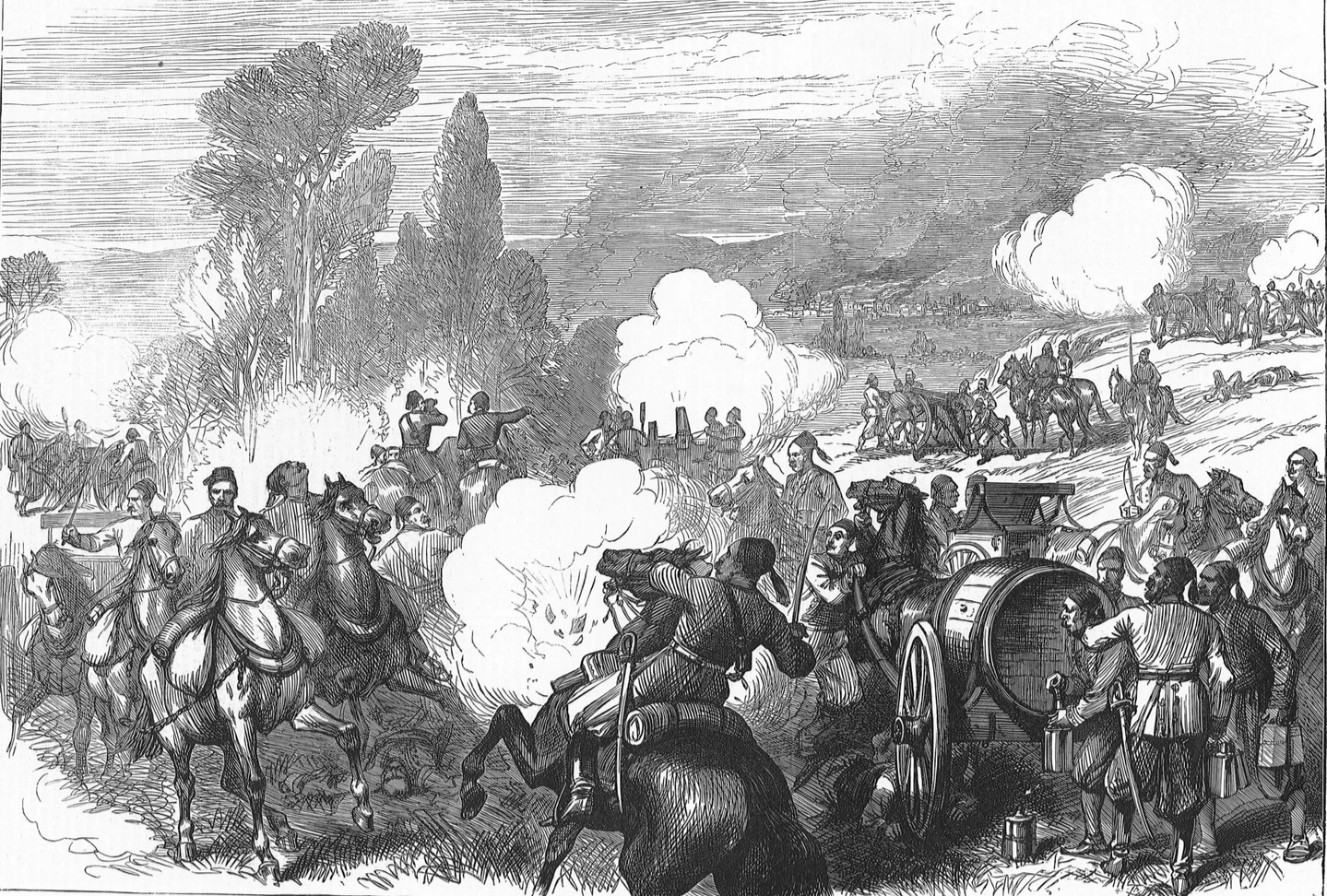
- Ottoman artillery fire on Russian lines at Katselovo
Date	September 5 [O.S. August 24] 1877
Location	Katselovo
Result	Ottoman victory

Belligerents
Ottoman Empire	Russian Empire

Commanders and leaders
(Ottoman Empire) Mehmed Ali Pasha	(Russian Empire) Alexander III

Strength
Total of Katselovo and Ablanovo: 29,000 soldiers, 60 cannons	Total of Katselovo and Ablanovo: 13,000 soldiers, 54 cannons

Casualties and losses
Total of Katselovo and Ablanovo: 1,700 dead and wounded	Total of Katselovo and Ablanovo: 2,000 dead and wounded (including 56 officers)

The Battle of Katselovo was a conflict that took place on September 5, 1877, near the village of Katselovo on the borders of the Ottoman Empire, during the Russo-Turkish War (1877–1878), and resulted in an Ottoman victory.

== Battle ==
The Ottoman forces were commanded by Mehmed Ali Pasha, while the Russian army was under the overall command of Alexander III. As a result of the battle, the Ottomans, after heavy fighting, pushed the Russian army back to Gorsko Ablanovo. When Mehmed Ali Pasha reached Ablanovo, he managed to drive the Russians out of the village on September 6th during the Battle of Ablanovo, repelling the counter-attack attempts of Alexey Alekseyevich Timofeev.

== Gallery ==
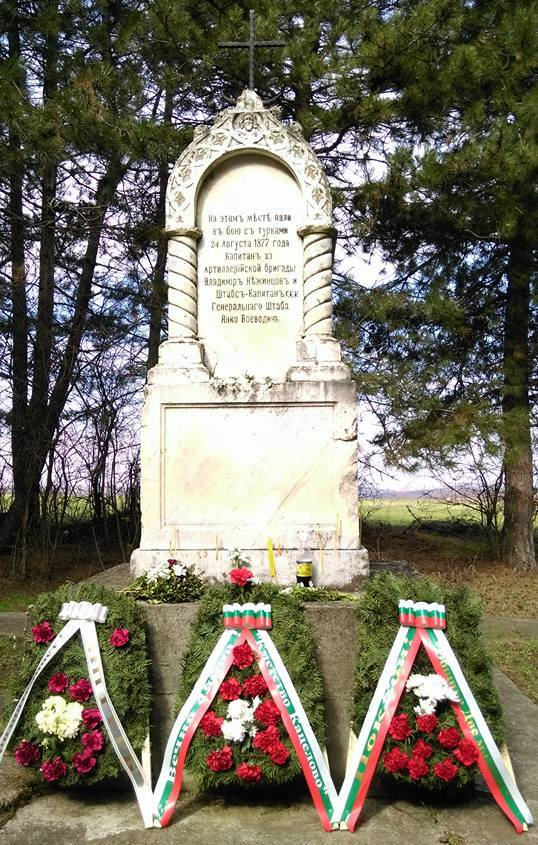
Monument dedicated to two Bulgarian captains (Vladimir Nezhintsov and Yanko Voivodich) killed during the conflict in Katselovo

== Bibliography ==
- Bodart, Gaston (1908). Militär-historisches Kriegs–Lexikon (1618–1905) [Historical Military War Dictionary (1618–1905)] (in German). Vienna: C. W. Stern.
- Grzesicki, Wiedstruck (1911). The Russo-Turkish War of 1877-1878 on the Balkan Peninsula (in German). Vienna: L. W. Seidel & Sohn. ISBN 9783747758342.
