= Ministry of State Property =

Russian Empire Ministry

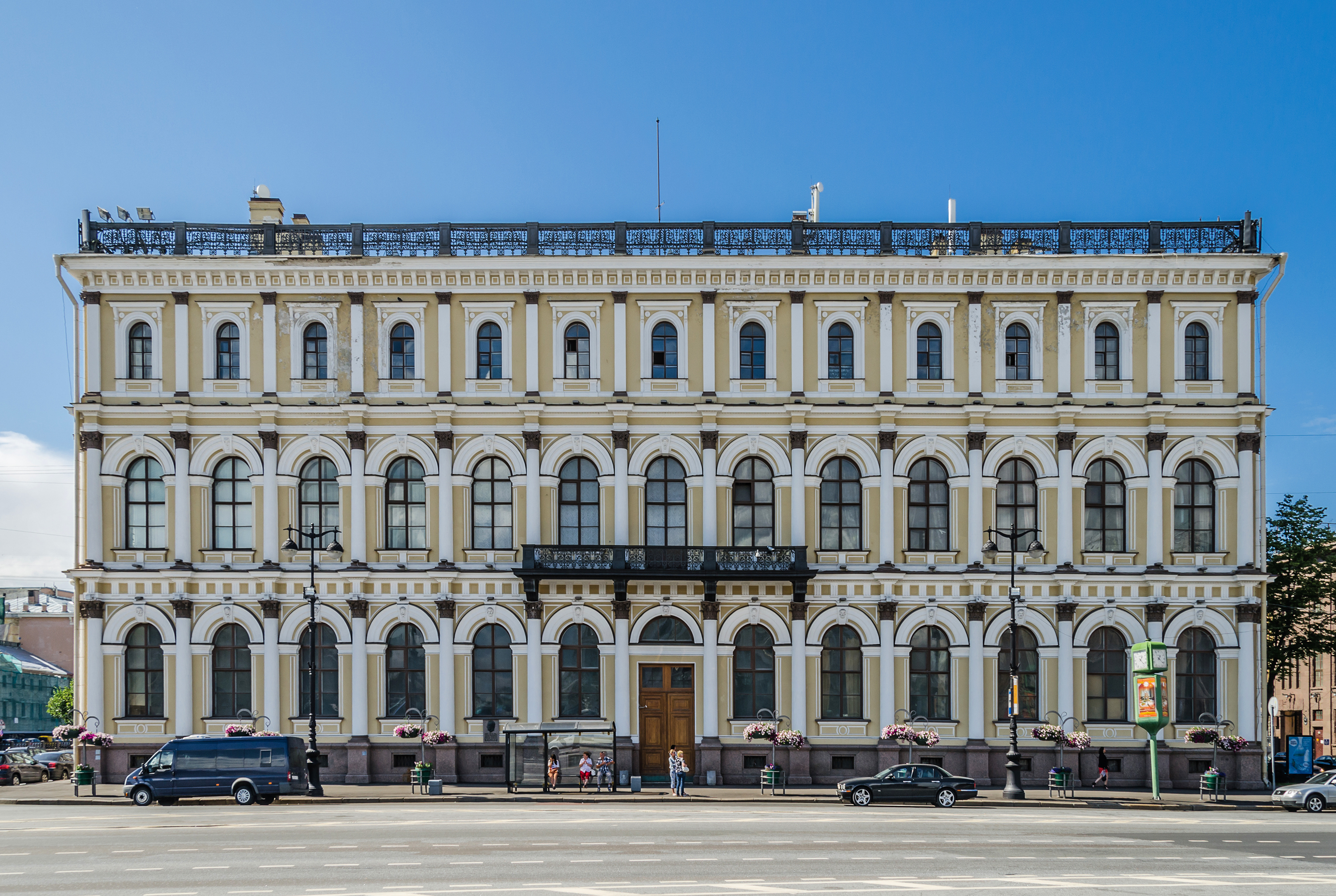
The former Ministry of State Property building at Saint Isaac's Square

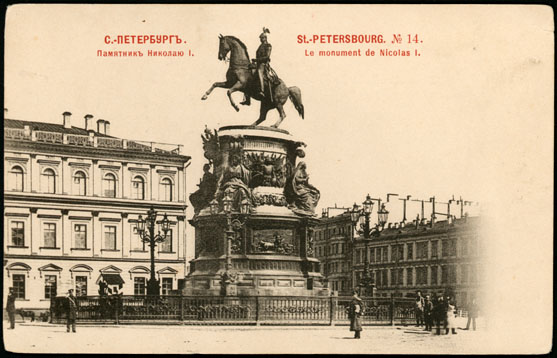
The Ministry building during the early 1900s (on the left)

The Ministry of State Property, also translated as the Ministry of State Domains (Russian: Министерство государственных имуществ (МГИ), Ministerstvo gosudarstvennykh imushestv (MGI)), was the ministry in the government of the Russian Empire which controlled government-owned lands and any other government property, especially farms and agricultural land, and prior to the peasant reform of 1863, the state peasants that worked the lands.

== History ==
When Ministries were introduced in 1802, there was no original independent ministry to oversee state property. These powers and responsibilities were divided among the Ministry of Domestic Affairs and Ministry of Finance. Since 1811, control over government assets was exercised by the Department of State Assets of the Ministry of Finance, and later the Fifth Department of His Imperial Majesty's Own Chancellery. After a nationwide crop failure and reconsideration of peasant and serf policy, an independent Ministry was created to take care of these issues, including reapportionment of land in the Taurida Governorate and encouragement of potato cultivation as an attempt to diversify Russia's crop.

=== Founding and expansion ===
The Ministry of State Property was founded on 26 December 1837. In 1843, a Forest Department was added together with the Foresters' Corps. In 1845, the Agricultural Department was first organized, and from 1848 to 1856 and 1874 to 1881 the ministry also included government horse breeding facilities. In 1857, the Crimean Tatars and several Nogai murzas petitioned the Ministry for more land in order to alleviate their poverty, on the basis that their ancestors were granted titles and deeds by Catherine II and they had a legitimate claim for ownership. However, the Ministry concluded that although the Tatars possessed proof of the noble status granted to their forefathers, those ancestors were long dead and claims based on their service had no significance. Faced with no guarantee of rights from the Russian government, the Nogai obtained permission to emigrate to Turkey, and between the fall of 1859 and 1860, some 35,000 Nogai had left the region, virtually the entire population. From 1873 to 1905, there was a Mountains Department, which was originally in the Finance Ministry. The Ministry also organized a Scientific Committee as a society devoted to horticulture, agriculture and economics, as well as experimental agriculture.

=== Reorganization ===
On 21 March 1894, the ministry was reorganized into the Ministry of Agriculture and State Property. In May 1905, the profile and status changed once again - the ministry was again reorganized into the General Administration of Land Use and Agriculture, which realized Pyotr Stolypin's agrarian reforms of the early 1900s. In October 1915, the General Administration was finally reverted to the Ministry of Agriculture and State Property.

== Duties ==
The Ministry of State Property was charged with control of government assets (fiscal lands, articles of tribute, forests of the fiscal departments), general oversight of the carrying out of orders about forest preservation and the encouragement of forest cultivation, management of mountain and saltwater assets, protection of mineral water sources and management of Caucasus mineral waters, management of handicrafts, custody of certain groups of people, management and organization of peasants, which would enhance their welfare. In 1858, there were an estimated 19 million state peasants under the administration of the Ministry of State Property, which represented almost half of the total rural population.

The Minister of Agriculture and State Property was the chief manager of mountain assets, which he had power over through the Mountains Department, where he headed the most powerful mountain management body, the Mountains Council (Russian: Горный совет), as well as the Mountain Scientific Committee, and local mountains jurisdictions.

== Ministers ==
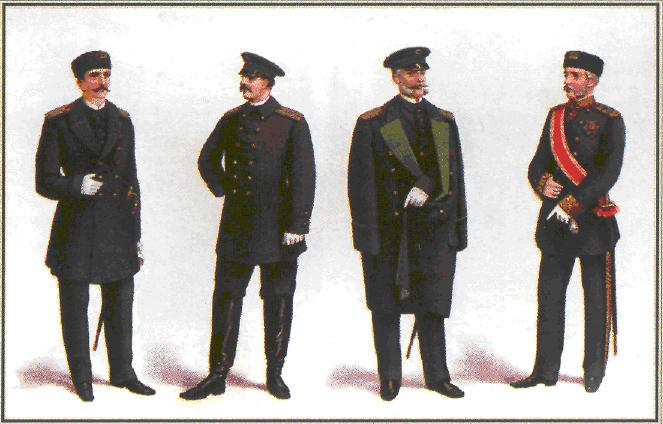
Uniform of Ministry officials

The first Minister of State Property was Pavel Kiselyov, from 1837 to 1856. From 1872 to 1879, the position was held by Pyotr Valuyev, from 1881 to 1893 by Mikhail Nikolayevich Ostrovsky, from 1893 to 1905 by Alexey Sergeyevich Yermolov, and from 1908 to 1915 by Alexander Krivoshein. From 1837 to 1917 there were a total of 18 ministers.

The House of the Ministry of State Assets was located on Saint Isaac's Square, 42 Bol'shaya Morskaya Ulitsa.

== Structure ==
The Ministry of State Assets contained the following departments (among other short-lived temporary ones):

- Ministry of State Property
  - Minister of Agriculture and State Property
  - Deputy Minister of Agriculture and State Property
  - Councils:
    - Minister's Council (Cabinet)
    - Agricultural Council
    - Mountains Council
  - Scientific Committee
    - Agricultural Bureau
  - Departments:
    - Department of Forests (from 1843)
      - Foresters' Corps
      - Special Forests Committee
    - Department of Agriculture (from 1845)
      - Agricultural Statistics Division
      - Land Schools Division
      - Agricultural Economy Division
      - Shrubs Committee
    - Department of Land Use and Rural Industry (from 1866)
    - Department of Mountains (1873–1905)
      - Geological Committee
      - Mountain Industry Council
      - Mountain Special Committee
  - Chancellery
    - Archives
    - Legal Advisory Section

== See also ==
- Ministry of Finance of the Russian Empire
- Russian Council of Ministers
