= Trastenik =

Trastenik Тръстеник
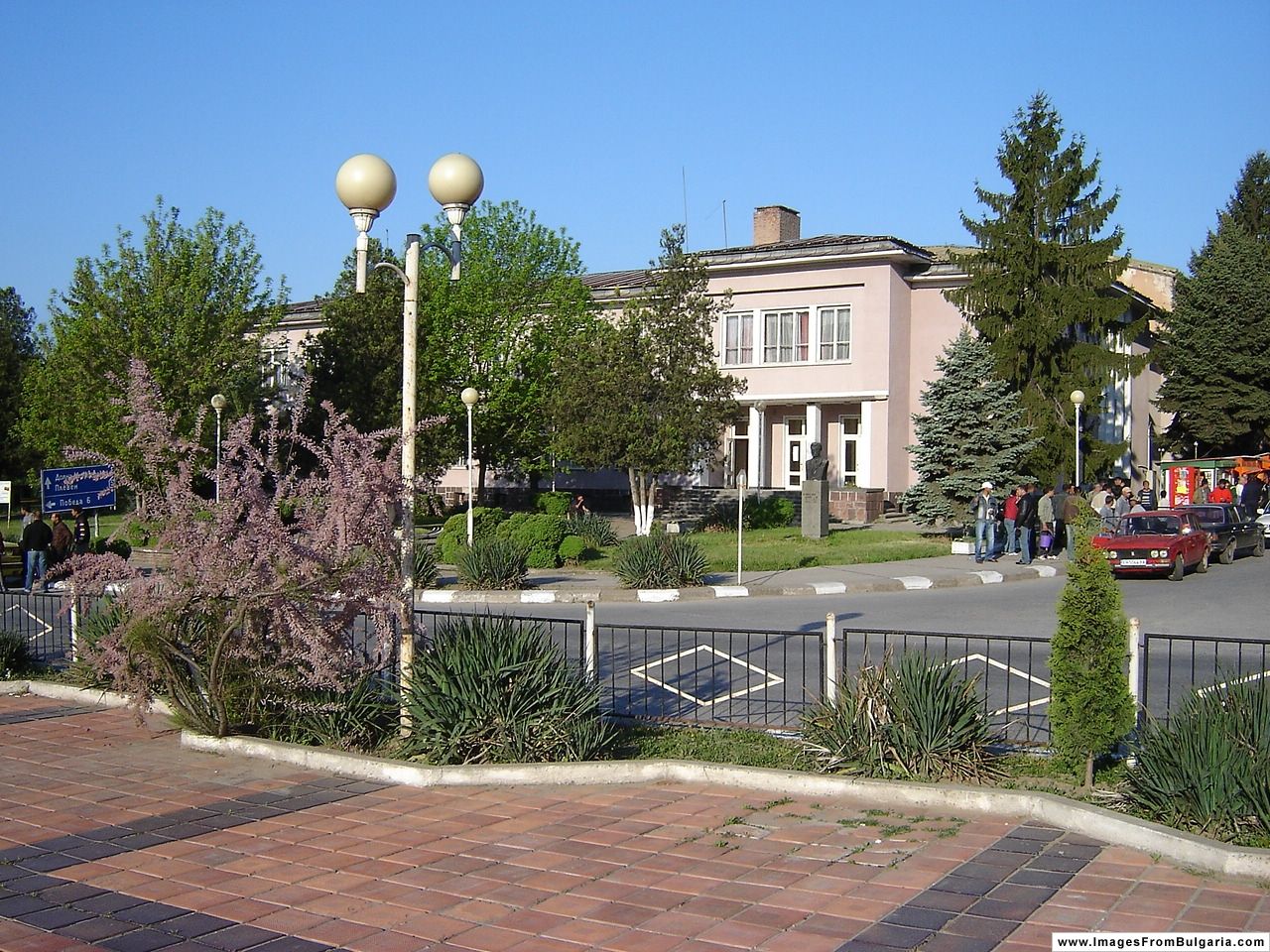

- Location of Trastenik
- Coordinates: 43°31′N 24°28′E
- Country: Bulgaria
- Provinces (Oblast): Pleven

Government
  - Mayor: Metodi Sirashki
- Elevation: 112 m (367 ft)

Population (2008)
  - Total: 4,710
- Time zone: UTC+2 (EET)
  - Summer (DST): UTC+3 (EEST)
- Postal Code: 5857
- Area code: 06551

Trastenik (Bulgarian: Тръстеник pronounced [trɐstɛˈnik], also transliterated Trǎstenik) is a town in central northern Bulgaria, part of Dolna Mitropoliya municipality, Pleven Province. It lies 18 kilometres northwest of Pleven and 30 kilometres south of the Danube, between the Vit and Iskar rivers.

Although several ancient mounds and traces of Roman settlement dating to the 1st-2nd century have been discovered by archaeologists, the earliest written data regarding modern Trastenik dates to the 15th century. The town has an Eastern Orthodox church, the Church of the Dormition of the Theotokos, built between 1880 and 1886, as well as a community centre (chitalishte) named after Neofit Rilski.

In Ottoman Turkish, it was known as Tirsinik under Ottoman rule and was the hometown of Ahi of Niğbolu, who was an Ottoman poet (1473-1517), and Ismail Aga of Tirsinik (?-1806), who was a regional power holder (Ayan) in Rusçuk. During the Ottoman rule, the town was a small village known as Marashka Trastenik, famous for paying its taxes in horses. There is an annual festival held in the town on January 20 to celebrate a legend of the day that the horse population, which had been decimated by disease, was replenished by an old mare past her breeding prime, allowing the village to pay its tax. There is a historical place called Manafski Grobište.
