= 12th Infantry Division (Russian Empire) =

- 12-я пехотная дивизия
- Active: 1806 – c. 1918
- Country: Russian Empire
- Branch: Russian Imperial Army
- Role: Infantry
- Garrison/HQ: Proskurov
- Engagements: World War I

The 12th Infantry Division (Russian: 12-я пехотная дивизия, 12-ya Pekhotnaya Diviziya) was an infantry formation of the Russian Imperial Army that existed in various formations from the early 19th century until the end of World War I and the Russian Revolution. The division was based in Lutsk in the years leading up to 1914. It fought in World War I and was demobilized in 1918.

== Organization ==
The 12th Infantry Division was part of the 12th Army Corps.

- 1st Brigade (HQ Proskurov)
  - 45th Azov Infantry Regiment
  - 46th Dnieper Infantry Regiment
- 2nd Brigade (HQ: 1903: Vinnitsa, 1913: Kamenets-Podolsk)
  - 47th Ukrainian Infantry Regiment
  - 48th Odessa Infantry Regiment
- 12th Artillery Brigade (HQ Proskurov)
