= Mehmed Ali Pasha (marshal) =

Prussian-born Ottoman military officer (1827–1878)

Mushir Mehmed Ali Pasha
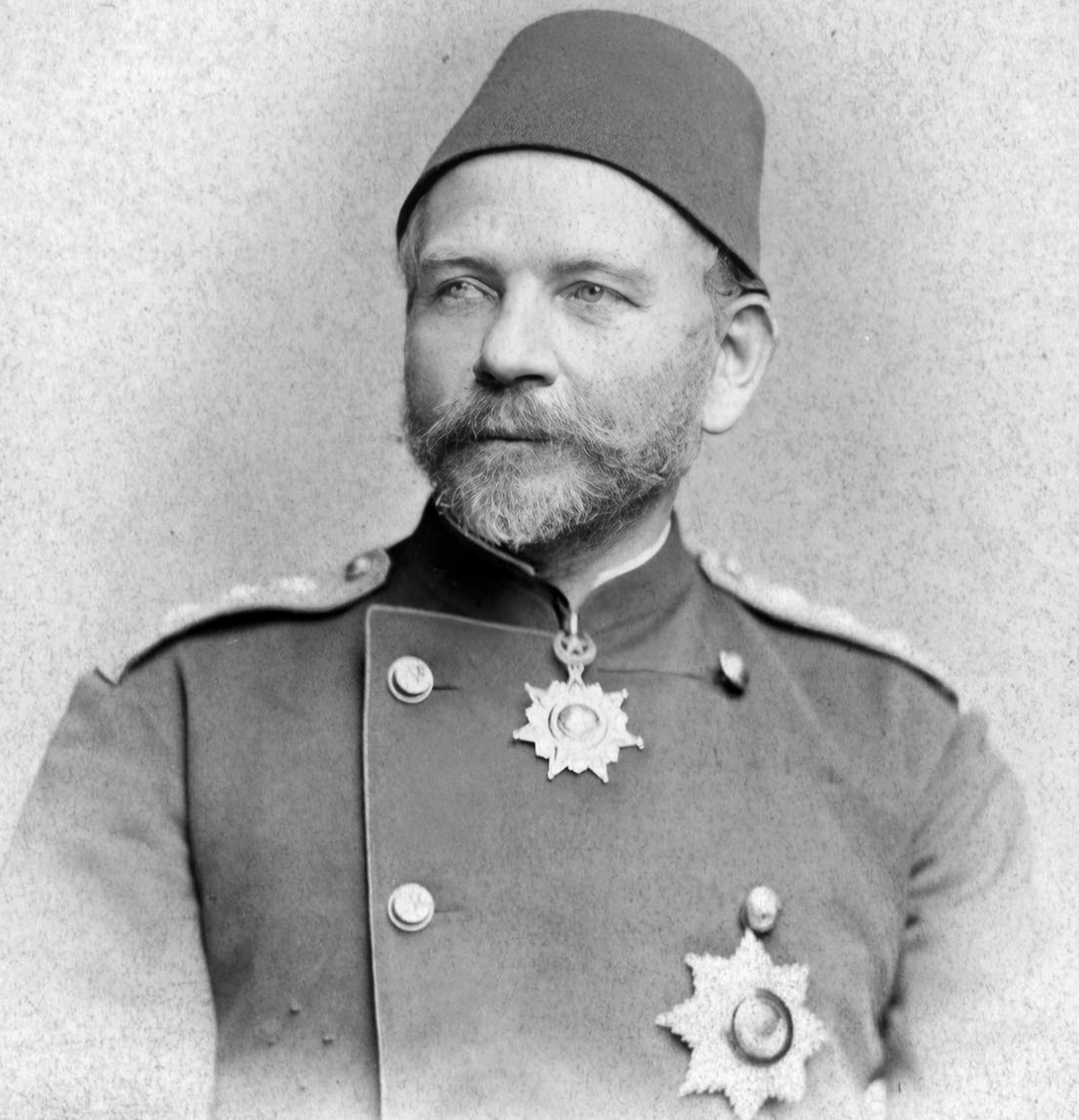
- Mehmed Ali Pasha, c. 1878
- Born: Ludwig Karl Friedrich Detroit; November 18, 1827; Magdeburg, Prussia (modern Germany)
- Died: September 7, 1878 (aged 50); Gjakova, Kosovo Vilayet, Ottoman Empire (modern Kosovo)
- Military career
- Rank: Marshal; Chief of Staff of the Ottoman Army
- Known for: Delegate of the Ottoman Empire at the 1878 Congress of Berlin
- Conflicts: Crimean War; Russo-Turkish War (1877–1878); Battle of Katselovo; Battle of Ablanovo; Attack against Mehmed Ali Pasha †

Mehmed Ali Pasha (November 18, 1827 – September 7, 1878) was a Prussian-born Ottoman career officer and marshal. He was the grandfather of the Turkish statesman Ali Fuat Cebesoy, and the great-grandfather of famous poets Nâzım Hikmet and Oktay Rıfat Horozcu and the socialist activist, lawyer, and athlete Mehmet Ali Aybar.

== Biography ==
Mehmed Ali was born as Ludwig Karl Friedrich Detroit (also known as Carl Detroy) in Magdeburg, Prussia. His parents were Carl Friedrich Detroit and Henriette Jeanette Severin. The French family name points to Huguenot ancestry, as a descendant of Protestant refugees from France in the 16th or 17th century. During his teenage years in 1843 he ran away to sea, and traveled to the Ottoman Empire, where he converted to Islam and was circumcised. There, in 1846, Âli Pasha, later Grand Vizier, sent him to a military school. He received a commission in the Ottoman Army in 1853 and fought against Russia in the Crimean War. He was made a brigadier general and Pasha in 1865.

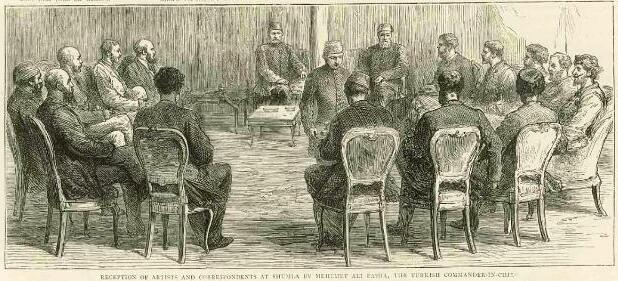
Mehemet Ali Pasha, as Turkish Commander in Chief holds a press conference in Shumla, 1877

In the 1877–1878 war against Russia, Mehmed Ali led the Turkish army in Bulgaria. He was successful in his operations on the Lom river (August–September 1877), such as at Katselovo and Ablanovo, but was eventually afterward forced back by his opponents. He failed to effect a junction with Süleyman Hüsnü Pasha, and was superseded by the latter.

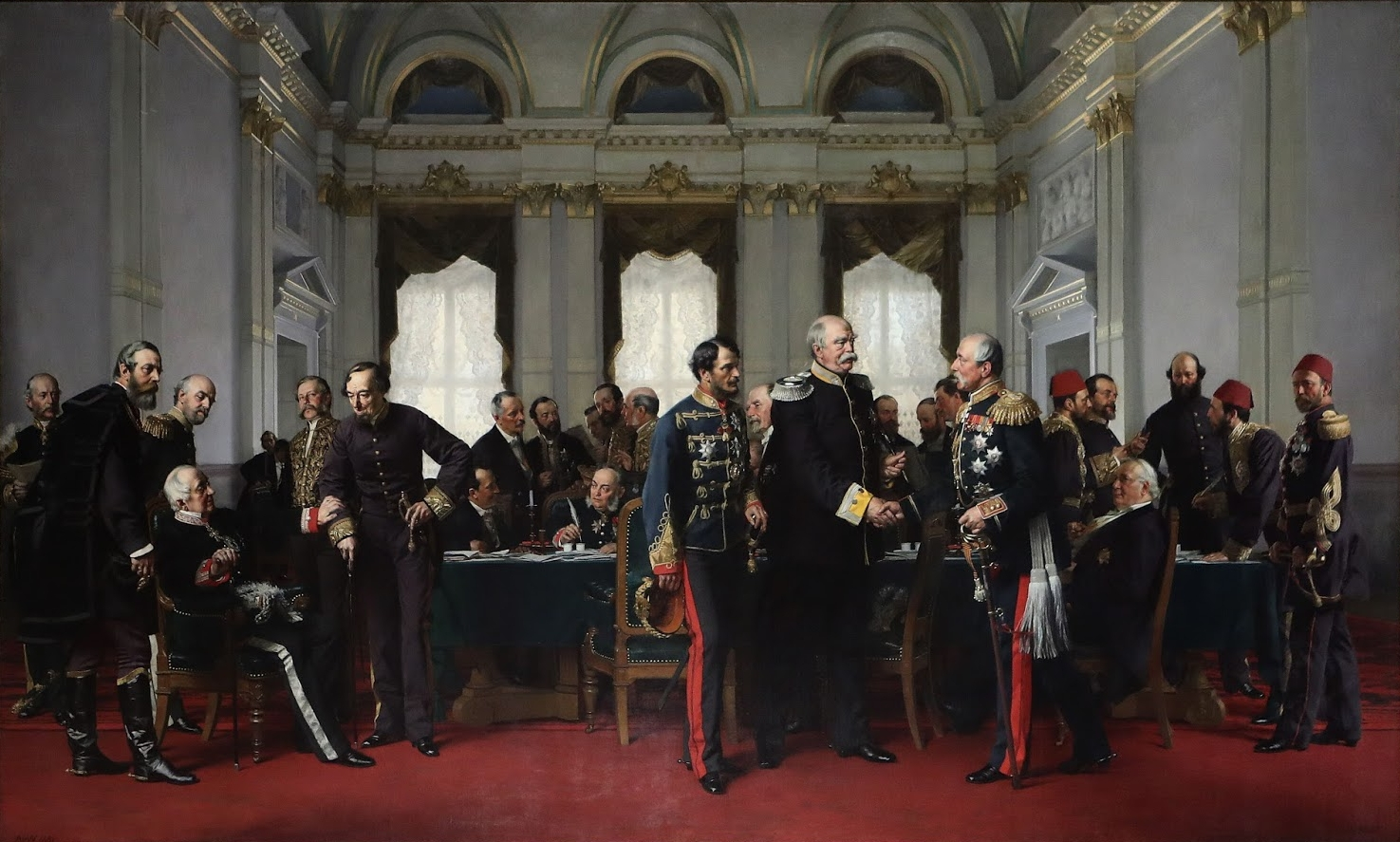
Painting of the Congress of Berlin by Anton von Werner (far right: Mehmed Ali Pasha), 1878

Later in 1878 he was a participant at the Congress of Berlin.

== Death ==
In August 1878, the Ottoman government selected him to overview the process of the cession of the Plav-Gucia region to Montenegro in compliance to the decisions of the Congress of Berlin. Mehmed Ali Pasha's first task was the pacification of the Albanian League of Prizren, which opposed the border change as part of the areas (Plav-Gucia/Plav-Gusinje) were inhabited by ethnic Albanians. He arrived in Kosovo in late August, attempting to make local Albanians comply with the Berlin Treaty but was blocked from any further movement towards the Ottoman-Montenegrin border by the local committees of the Albanian League. Stationed in Abdullah Pasha Dreni's estate in Gjakova with several Ottoman battalions he was killed on September 6 after a seven-day battle with several thousand Albanians opposing cession of Albanian inhabited lands to European powers.

== Gallery ==
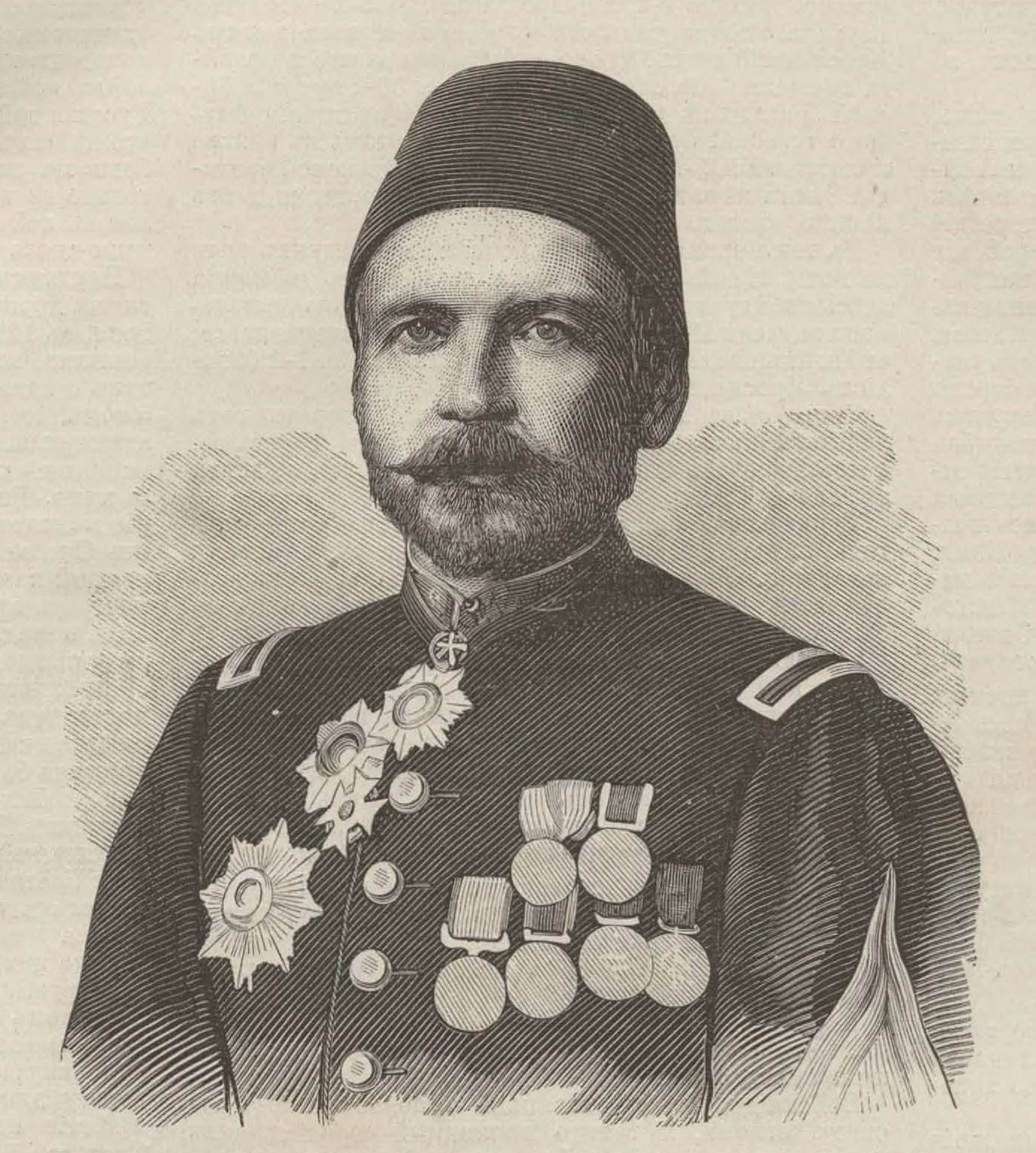

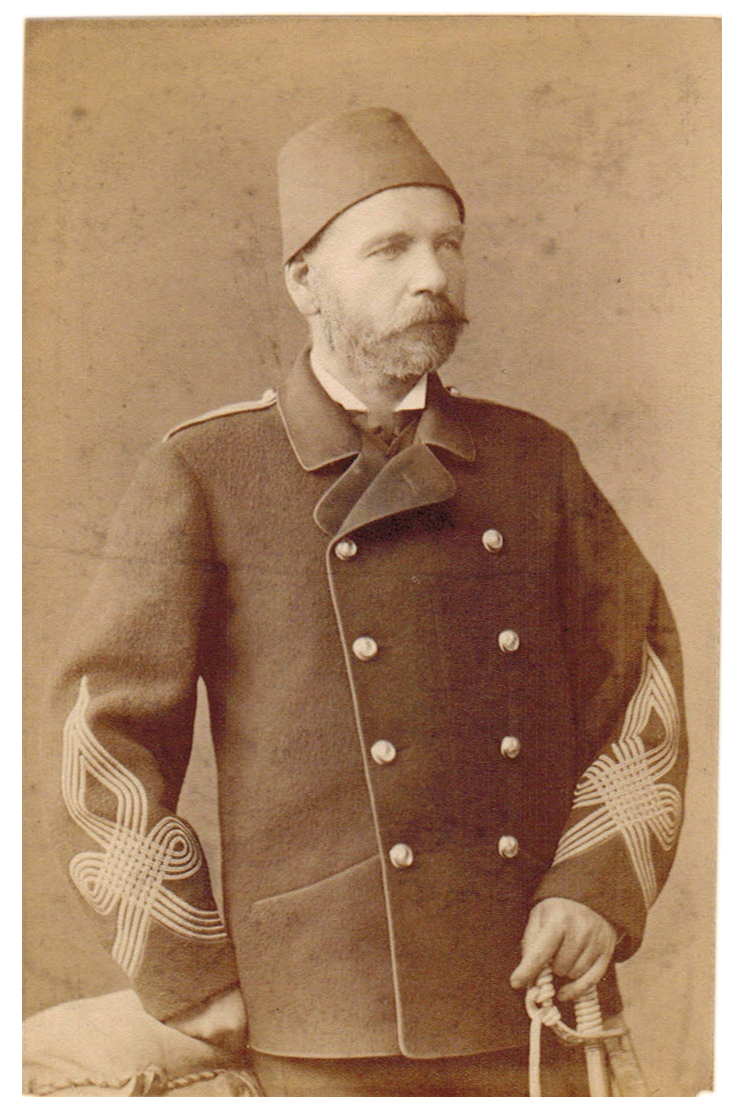

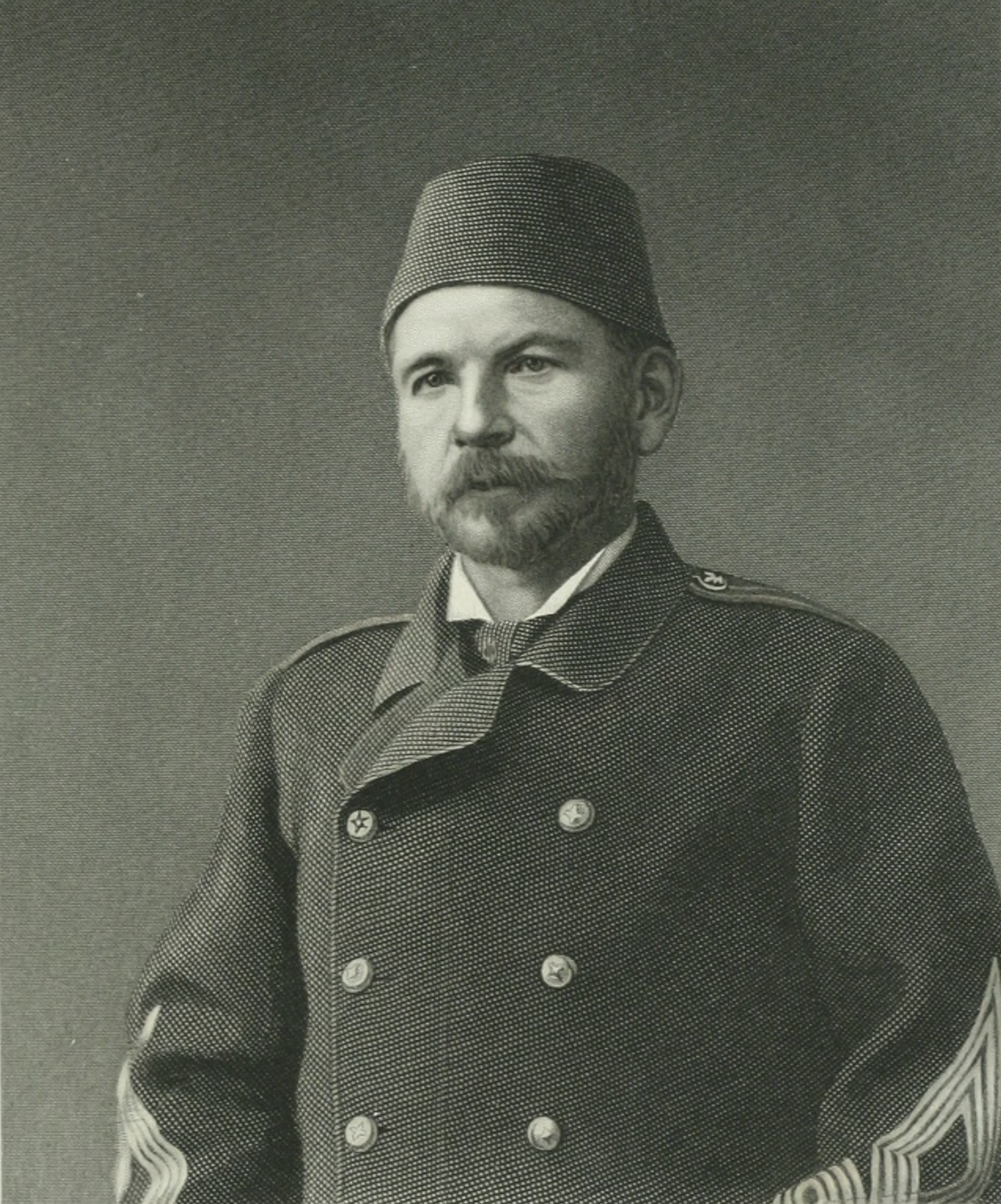

== Family tree ==
Sırp Ömer Lütfi; Mihajlo Latas | Çerkes Hafız Mehmed Paşa | Macar Ali
Mustafa Celalettin Pasha; Konstanty Borzęcki | Saffet | Mehmed Ali | Ayşe Sıdıka | Kürt Hafize | Kamil | Tahir
Hüseyin Hüsnü | Hayriye | Mehmet Nazım | Macar Ali Rıfat | Hasan Enver | Leyla | Mehmet Ali Gerede | Eleanor Louisa Bendon | Zekiye Hatice | İsmail Fazıl | Adviye | Tevfik
Rahmi Arslan | Nimet | Muhsin | Tahsin | Hikmet | Celile | Samih Rıfat | Münevver | Mustafa Celalettin | Mehmet Ali | Sara | Leyla Makbule | Mehmet Ali Cebesoy | Ali Fuat Cebesoy
Alpaslan | Mehmet Ali Aybar | Nazım Hikmet Ran | Zeynep Menemencioğlu | Oktay Rıfat Horozcu | Hüsnüaşk Tanoğlu | İsmail Fazıl Cebesoy | Ayşe Cebesoy Sarıalp
