= Mikhail Nikolayevich Ostrovsky =

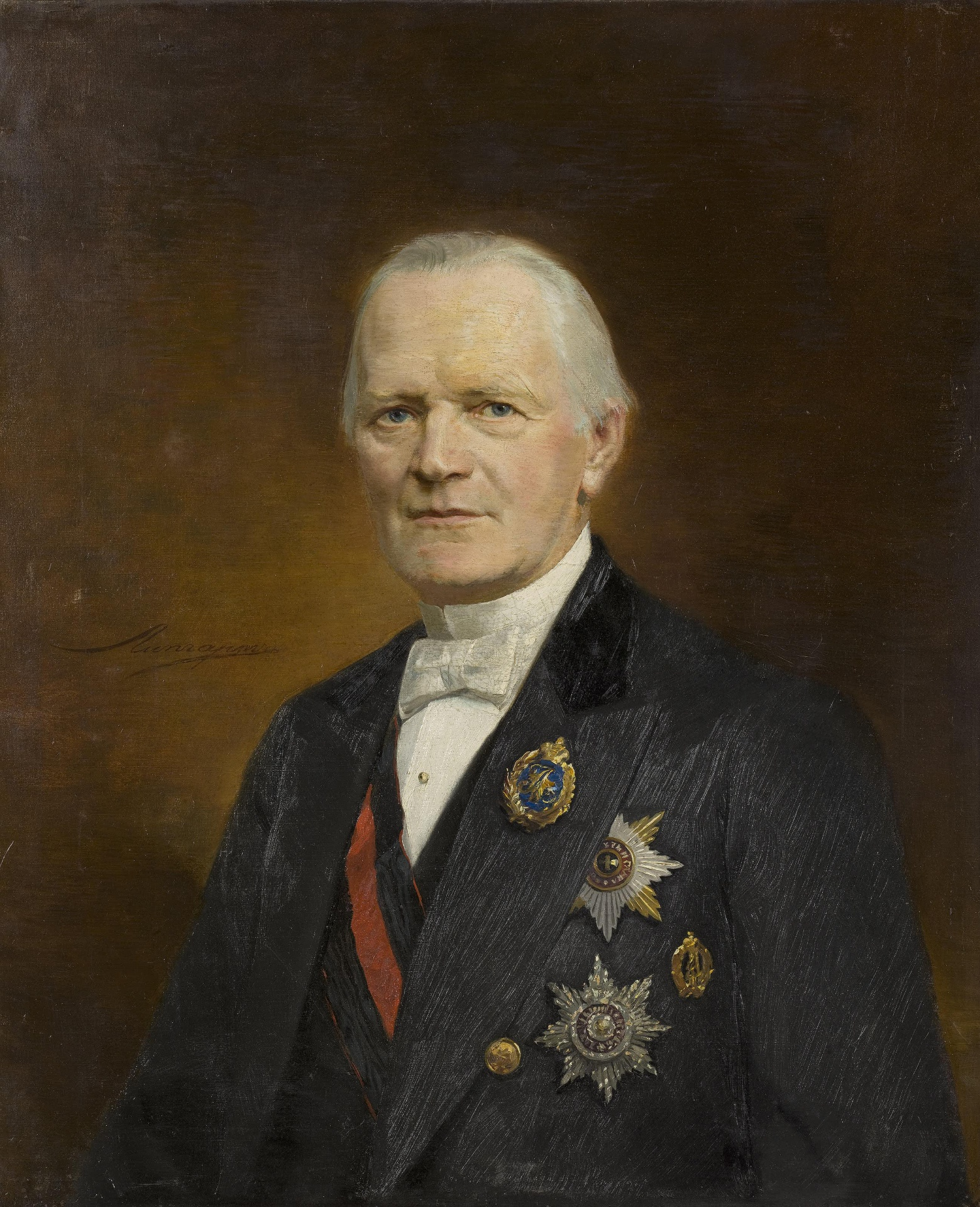
Portrait of Mikhail Ostrovsky, 1890-1900 by Ernst Friedrich von Liphart

Mikhail Nikolayevich Ostrovsky (Russian: Михаил Николаевич Островский; 1827–1901) was a Russian statesman who served as Minister of State Property (a post roughly equivalent to the American position of Secretary of the Interior) during the reign of Alexander III.

== Early life and career ==
Ostrovsky was born March 30 (April 11 new style), 1827, in the Zamoskvorechye District of Moscow. His father was a first-generation nobleman of the church estate, and his older brother Alexander Ostrovsky became a noted playwright.

Ostrovsky studied at the First Moscow Gymnasium and in 1848 was graduated from Moscow Imperial University. He entered government service in the office of the Civil Governor of Simbirsk, assisting Auditor General V. A. Tatarinov in the introduction of auditing reforms.

From April 17, 1871, to 1878, Ostrovsky was Associate State Comptroller. He was assigned to perform audits in Vladimir, Tula, Kaluga, Yaroslavl, Kostroma, Pskov, Vilna, Grodno, Kovno Province, and the former Kingdom of Poland (then a Russian possession). In 1877 he performed a field audit of the Caucasus Army.

== Later achievements and honors ==
In 1872, Ostrovsky was a made a senator, and in 1878 a member of the State Council of Imperial Russia.

From May 4, 1881, to January 1, 1893, Ostrovsky was Minister of State Property. He was in office in 1888 when an important law on the protection of forests was proclaimed.

From January 1, 1893, to October 3, 1899, Ostrovsky was chairman of the Department of Legislation of the State Council.

By an Imperial Rescript of April 26, 1899, Ostrovsky was made a Chevalier of the Order of St. Andrew.

Ostrovsky was an honorary member of the Imperial Academy of Sciences, Chairman of the Museum of Applied Knowledge in St. Petersburg, and (from May 15, 1883) an Actual Privy Counsellor, a civilian rank equivalent to full general or admiral.

Ostrovsky died July 25 (August 7 new style), 1901, in Saint Petersburg. His funeral was held July 28 in the Dukhovskaya Church of the Alexander Nevsky Lavra, and was attended by Ivan Durnovo (Chairman of the Council of Ministers) and others. He was buried in the Lavra's Nikolskoe Cemetery.

== Notes ==
1. That is, the head of the department responsible for managing property of the national government, not to be confused with most Interior Ministers who are responsible for state security
