= Babruysk railway station =

Railway station in Babruysk, Belarus

Coordinates: 53°08′15.6″N 29°11′42.5″E

Babruysk
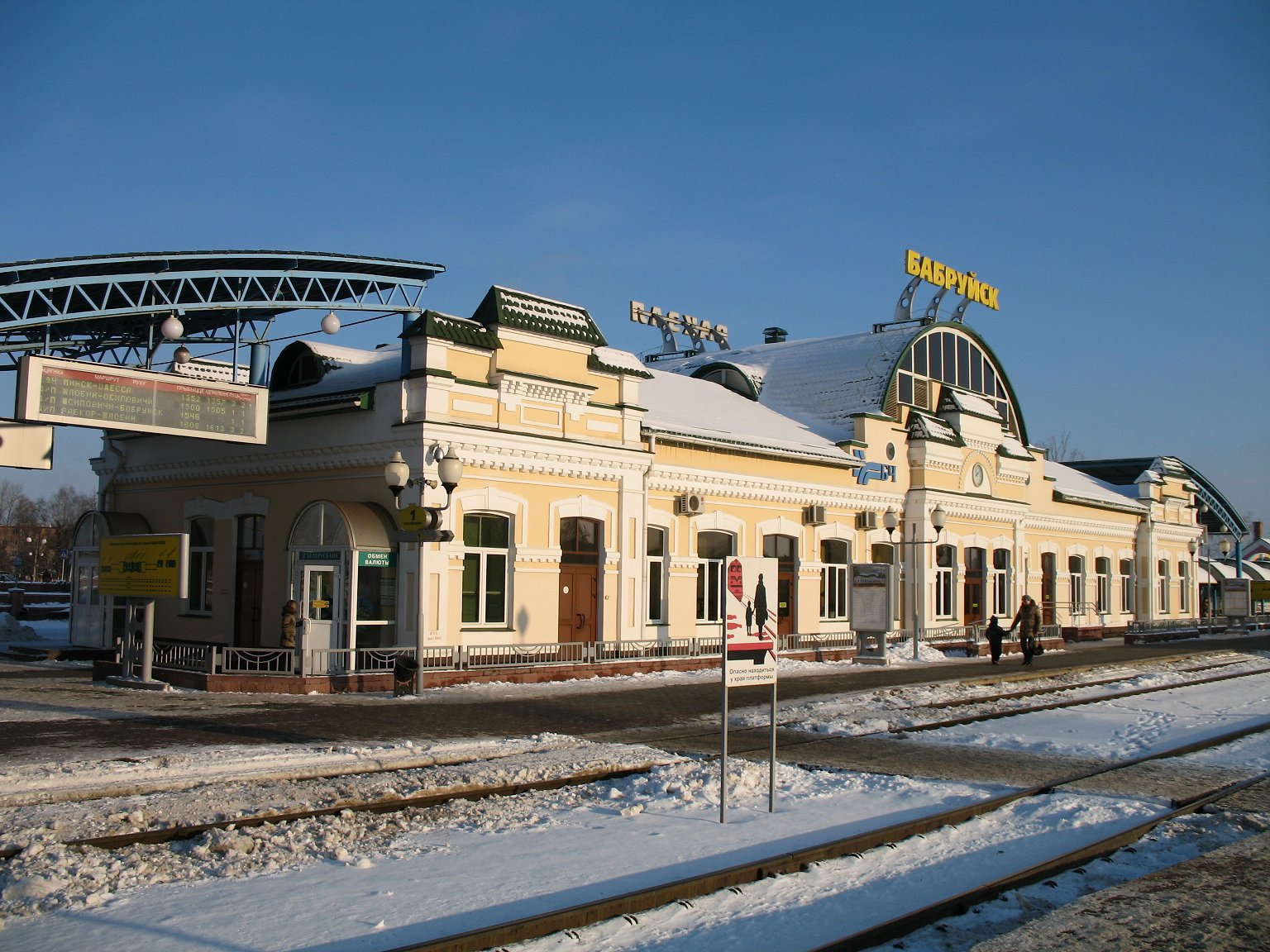

General information
- System: Belarusian Railway
- Owner: Belarusian Railway
- Lines: Asipovichy-Zhlobin railway line Babruysk-Rabkor railway line

Other information
- Station code: 147008

History
- Opened: 1873
- Electrified: Yes

Services
Preceding station	Babruysk-Rabkor	Following station
Location
- Location within Belarus

Babruysk Railway Station is a railway station in Babruysk, Belarus.

== History ==
The station was built by Karl Otto Georg von Meck as part of the third section of the Libau–Romny Railway constructed 1871–1874. The Minsk-Babruysk section was completed onin September 1873, with the first locomotive arriving that November. Over the next few decades the facilities of the railway service was improved, with a station building being completed in 1900. In 1932 a new connection to Starushki was added.

Tsar Nicholas II visited Babruysk Station in December, 1904, where he reviewed the 1st Brigade of the 40th Infantry Division of the Imperial Russian Army, stationed at the nearby Babruysk fortress.

10 billion rubles was spent in the 2004 to 2005 period to renovate the station, including new lighting and provision of flowerbeds.

== Gallery ==
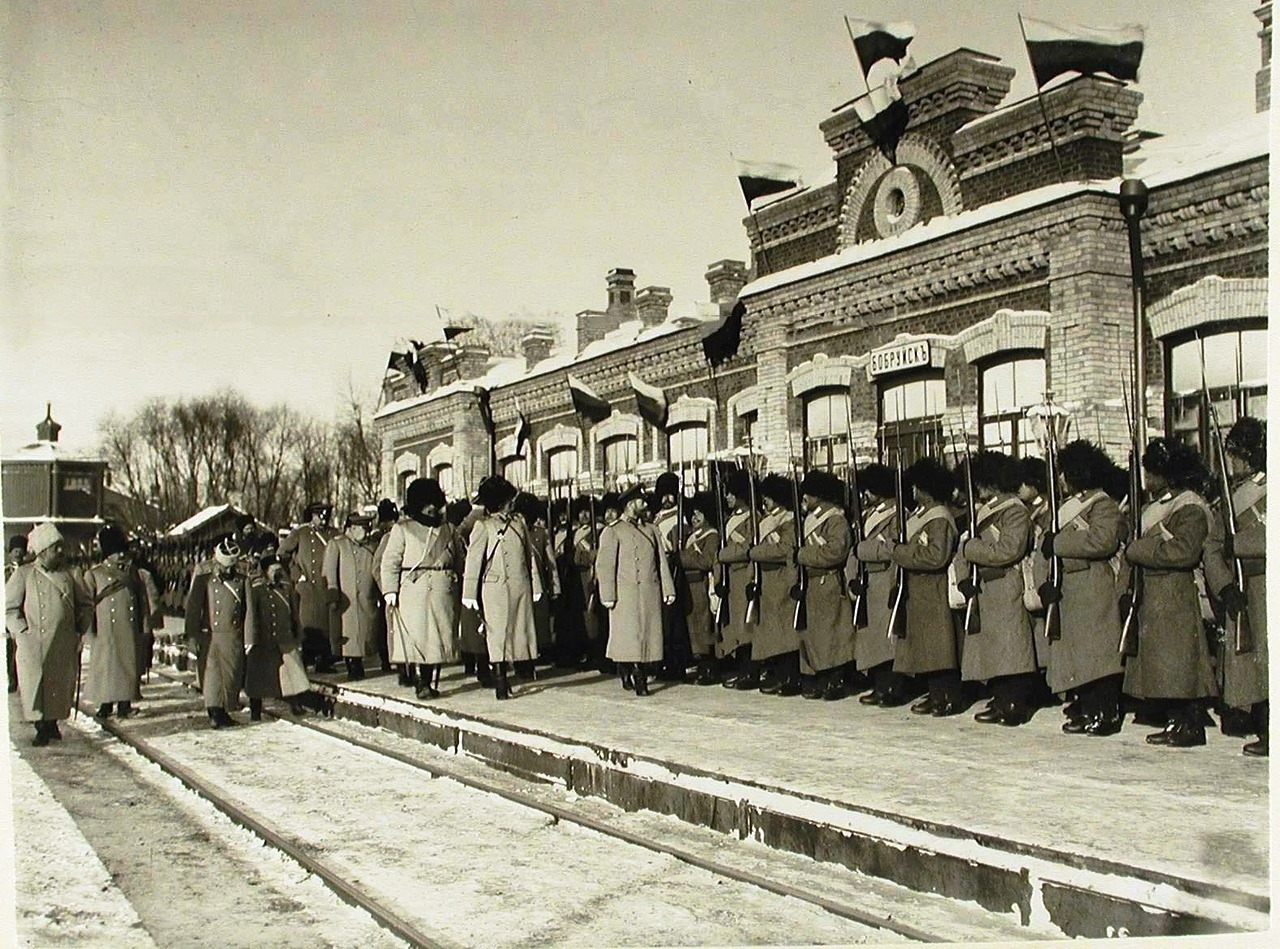
Tsar Nicholas II reviewing soldiers of the 157th Imeretinsky Infantry Regiment and the 158th Kutaisi Infantry Regiment at Bobruisk railway Station, 21 December 1904
