= Gorelik =

Gorelik or Gorelick (Russian: Горелик; Belarusian: Гарэлік: Harelik) is a Jewish occupational surname historically denoting a vodka distiller or trader. Its etymology is Slavic, from Belarusian harelka (гарэлка), a calque from Polish gorzałka, itself from German geprant Wein 'burnt wine'. Morphologically it resembles a Russian adjective meaning 'burnt' with the noun-forming suffix -ik. The latter is sometimes Anglicized, producing -ick. Notable people with the surname include:

- Adrián Gorelik (born 1957), Argentine architect
- Aleksandr Gorelik (1945–2012), Soviet pair skater
- Anastasiya Harelik (born 1991), Belarusian volleyball player
- Anatolii Horelik (1890–1956), Ukrainian activist
- Gennady Gorelik (born 1948), Russian physicist and philosopher
- Jamie Gorelick (born 1950), American attorney
- Kenny G (born as Kenneth Gorelick in 1956), American saxophonist
- Lena Gorelik (born 1981), German writer
- Lev Gorelik (born 1992), Russian footballer
- Lolita Milyavskaya (born as Lolita Markovna Gorelik in 1963), Russian singer, actress, TV and film director
- Mark Harelik (born 1951), American actor
- Mikhail Gorelik (born 1958), Soviet swimmer
- Mordecai Gorelik (1899–1990), American theatrical designer, producer, and director
- Olga Gorelik, Belarusian-born American pianist
- Sarah Gorelick (1933–2020), American pilot and one of the Mercury 13 female astronauts group
- Shirley Gorelick (1924–2000), American artist
- Wolf Gorelik (1933–2013), Russian conductor
- Victor Gorelick (1941–2020), American comic book editor and executive
- Yerucham Gorelick (1911–1983), American rabbi
- Zalman Gorelik (1908–1987), Belarusian geologist
