= Battle of Bobruysk (1918) =

- Part of the October Revolution, Polish–Soviet fights
Date	February 2 – March 11, 1918
Location	Near Babruysk, Belarus 53.141°N 29.253°E
Result	Polish victory

Belligerents
Russian SFSR	Poland

Commanders and leaders
gen. Romanowskij gen. Maksymowicz; Jukums Vācietis	Józef Dowbor-Muśnicki; Bolesław Jaźwiński; Stanisław Wrzaliński; Władysław Anders

Units involved
Red Army, Latvian Riflemen	Polish I Corps in Russia

Strength
+7,000 soldiers	30,000 soldiers

Casualties and losses
heavy	500–1,000

The Battle of Bobrujsk took place between February 2 – March 11, 1918. Units of the Polish I Corps in Russia, commanded by General Józef Dowbor-Muśnicki, fought with the Red Army over the control of the city of Babruysk (Polish: Bobrujsk), located in eastern Belarus.

== History ==
On July 24, 1917, Jozef Dowbor-Musnicki, who was a General of the Imperial Russian Army and an ethnic Pole, created a Polish tactical-operational unit of the Russian Army: one of the first such units during World War I. After the October Revolution of 1917, headquarters of the Polish I Corps in Russia decided to operate in Belarus, in the area marked by the towns of Rahachow – Zlobin – Babruysk.

In January 1918, the First Polish Corps, with its 30 000 soldiers, clashed for the first time with the Red Army, which pushed westwards. Polish troops captured Rahachow, but General Musnicki's target was the Babruysk with its fortress. As Musnicki stated, its capture would enable his soldiers to regroup and organize an effective defence. The siege of Babruysk began on February 2: the town and the fortress were defended by some 7000 Bolshevik soldiers, who capitulated on the next day, February 3. Poles captured large warehouses with food and ammunition. The Soviets decided to recapture the town, and initiated several assaults, all of which failed.

After the Treaty of Brest-Litovsk, Soviet Russia handed Babruysk over to the Imperial German Army. Under the circumstances, General Dowbor-Musnicki had to evacuate the town, leaving it in German hands.

The Battle of Bobrujsk is commemorated on the Tomb of the Unknown Soldier, Warsaw, with the inscription "BOBRUJSK 2 II – 11 III 1918".

== Sources ==
- Wacław Lipiński, Walki o niepodległość Polski w latach 1905 – 1918, Wolumen, Warszawa 1990
- Henryk Bagiński, Wojsko Polskie na Wschodzie 1914 – 1920, Warszawa 1990, reprint
- Mieczysław Wrzosek, Polski czyn zbrojny podczas pierwszej wojny światowej 1914–1918, Państwowe Wydawnictwo "Wiedza Powszechna", Warszawa 1990
