= Church of the Immaculate Conception of Saint Virgin Mary, Babruysk =

Church in Mogilev Region, Belarus

Coordinates: 53°8′31″N 29°13′7″E

Church of the Immaculate Conception of Saint Virgin Mary
- Касцёл Беззаганнага Зачацця Найсвяцейшай Дзевы Марыі
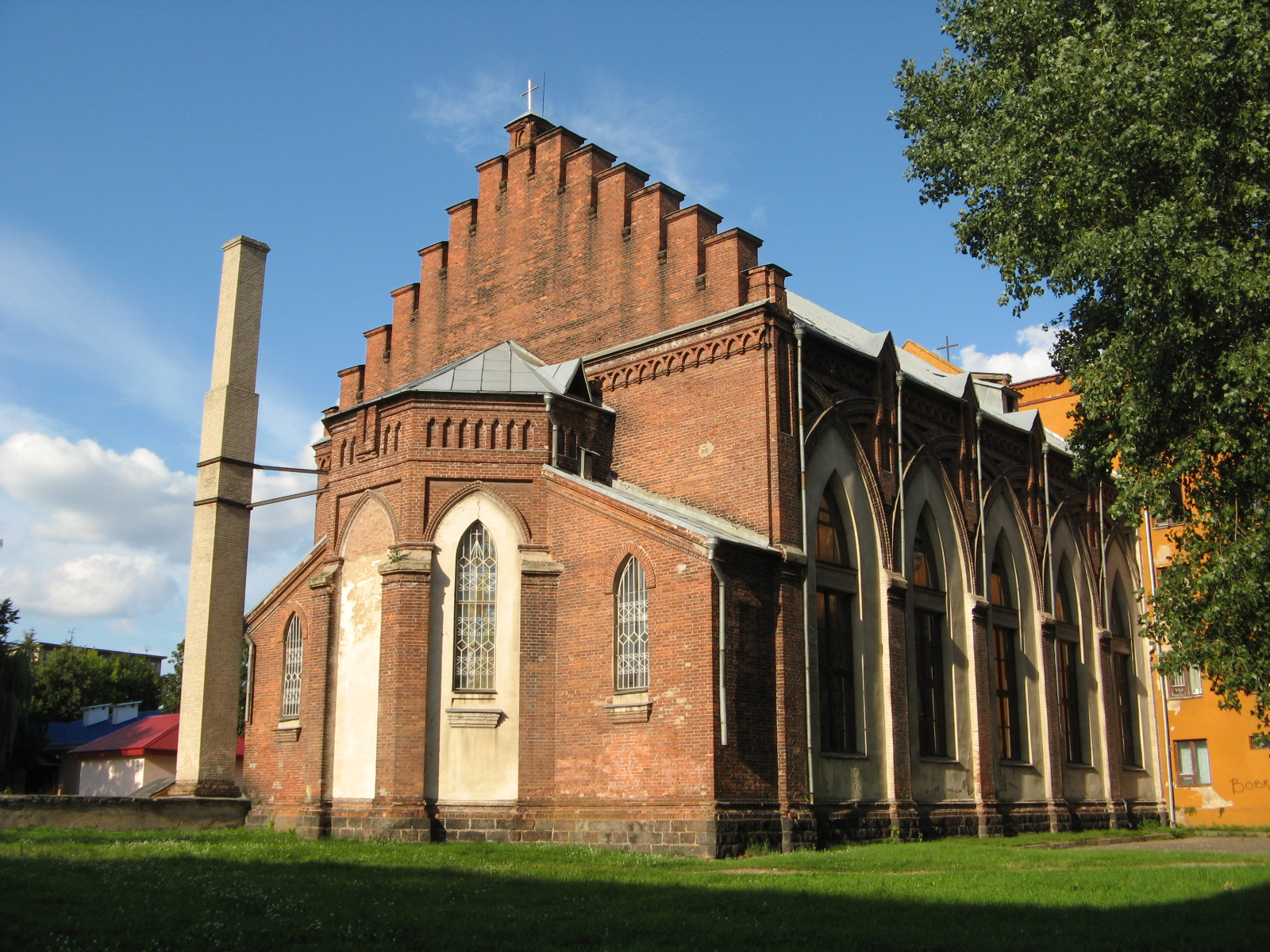
- The church in 2007
- Church of the Immaculate Conception of Saint Virgin Mary
- Location: Babruysk, Oktyabrskaya str., 121
- Country: Belarus
- Denomination: Roman Catholic

Architecture
- Architect: Stanislaw Shabunevsky
- Style: Neo-Gothic
- Years built: 1901-1903

Administration
- Diocese: Roman Catholic Archdiocese of Minsk–Mohilev

The Church of the Immaculate Conception of Saint Virgin Mary (Belarusian: Касцёл Беззаганнага Зачацця Найсвяцейшай Дзевы Марыі) in Babruysk, Belarus, is a Catholic church built in 1901–1903 and rebuilt in 1963. The original facades were vividly decorated in Neo-Gothic style. The church had a high bell tower in the front.

== History ==
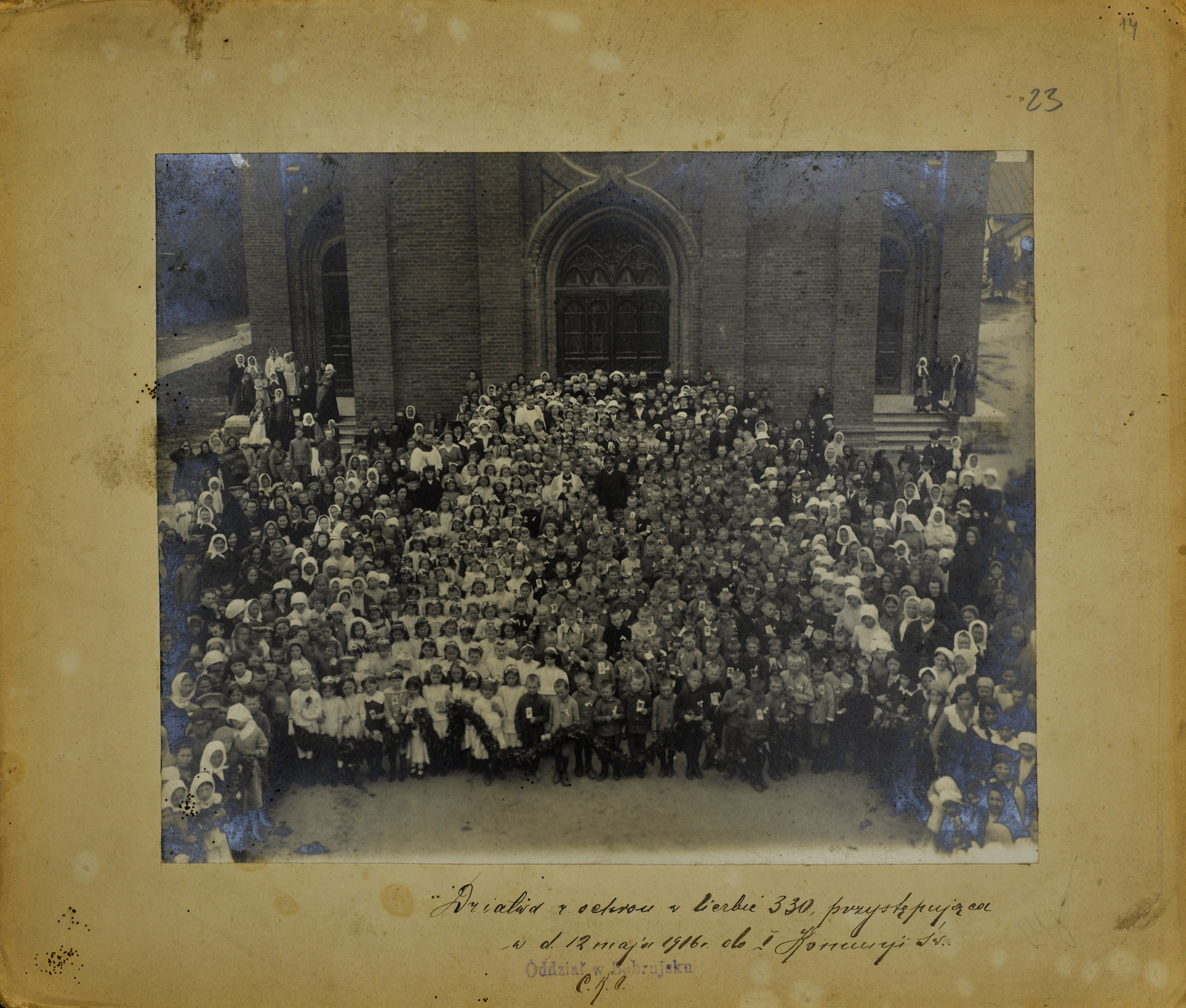
People near the church in 1916

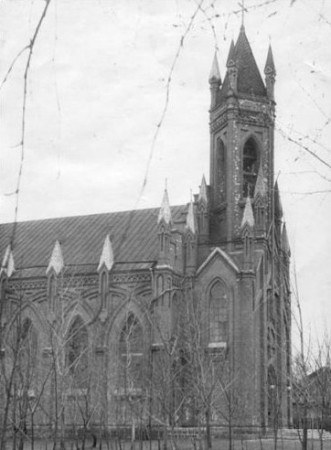
The church before 1919

=== 20th century ===
The church was built between 1901 and 1903 under the management of architect Stanislaw Shabunevsky. The main altar was consecrated on September 9, 1912. In 1907 two Rieger–Kloss pipe organs were installed in the church.

In 1922 the Soviet authorities prohibited all religious activity in Babruisk, but the locals continued to go to the church for baptisms and marriages. Only in 1935 was it closed. Soon the facades were stripped down. The former church was used as a granary.

During World War II the Fascists occupied the city and allowed Christianity to be freely professed. Until 1944 the masses in the church were again served by a German priest.

After the war, the church building was repurposed again as an archive, cinema hall, and a museum. Though in 1955 the government prohibited any alterations to the church's original historic appearance, in 1963 an administrative house was built into the church's walls.

In 1989 the authorities returned the church to the parish. On July 13, 1990, it was consecrated by the archbishop Tadevuš Kandrusievič.

=== 21st century ===
In 2009 Dominican nuns started working in the church.

In 2019 the building was given to city management. Though there are propositions to demolish the administrative building and reconstruct the church's facades in the original design, city authorities claim to have no funds for the project.
