= Stanislaŭ Šabunieŭski =

Soviet Architect

- Станіслаў Шабунеўскі
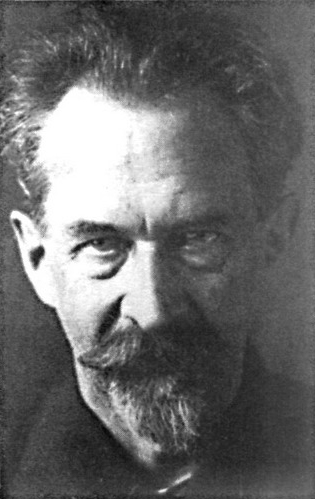
- Born: 1868; Skarodnaje, Yelʹsk District, Russian Empire
- Died: 1937 (aged 68–69); Soviet Union
- Occupation: Architect

Stanislaŭ Šabunieŭski (Belarusian: Станіслаў Шабунеўскі, 1868–1937) was an architect whose buildings "in many respects determined the modern appearance of Gomel" and a victim of Stalin's purges.

== Early years ==
Šabunieŭski was born into an impoverished Belarusian noble family in the village of Skarodnaje (now in the Yelʹsk District of Belarus). His father served as a postman, later as an assistant postmaster at the Babruysk district post office.

Šabunieŭski graduated from a gymnasium in Slutsk, then studied architecture in St. Petersburg. In 1897, he came to Gomel and started working in the local construction department of the Libau–Romny Railway.

== Architectural career ==
In the early 20th century, Šabunieŭski became a prolific designer of buildings in the centre of Gomel, alternating between different architectural styles – from classicism to modernism to constructivism. His first building designed in 1898 was a men's classical gymnasium, which combined the motifs of classical architecture and the then modern engineering techniques. Today, the building houses the Belarusian State University of Transport.

He went on to design the offices of the Aroł and Vilna commercial banks, Savoy hotel (destroyed during military hostilities in 1919), fire station as well as grand houses for Gomel merchants and prosperous professionals. In 1913, Šabunieŭski designed a district hospital funded by the last owner of the Gomel Palace, Princess Iryna Paskievič. Today the building still functions as a hospital.

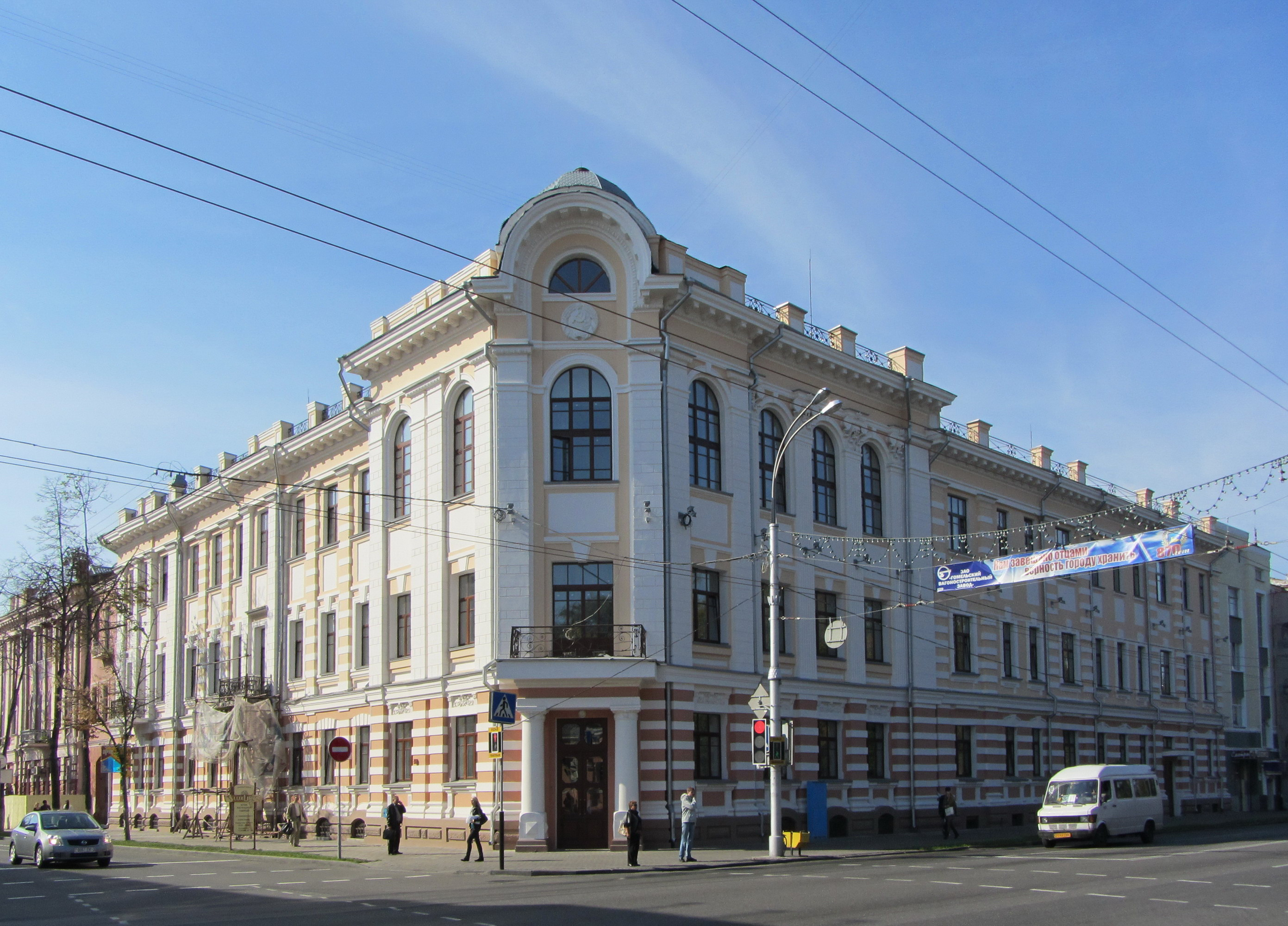
Building of the former Aroł commercial bank

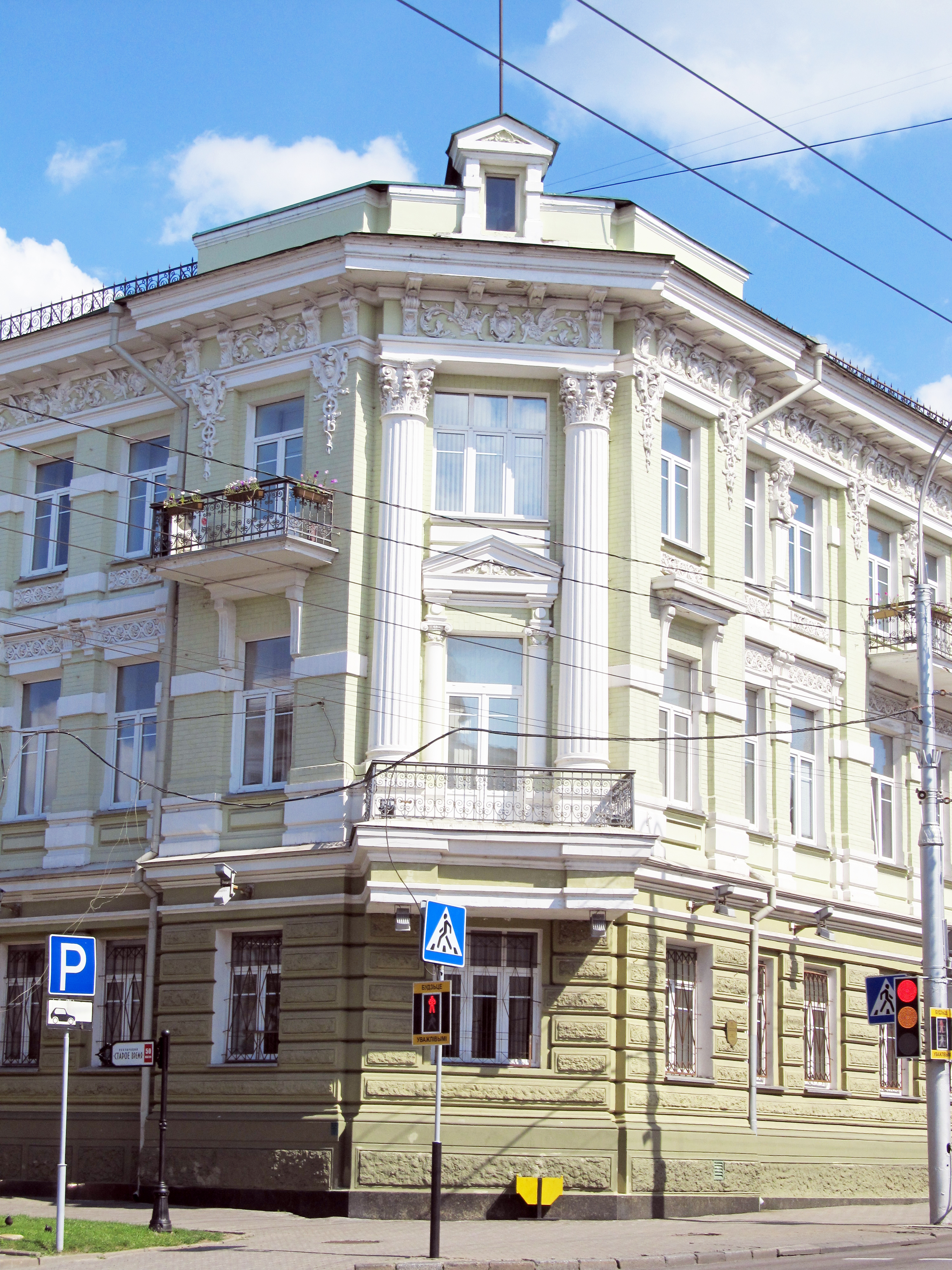
Building of the former Vilna commercial bank

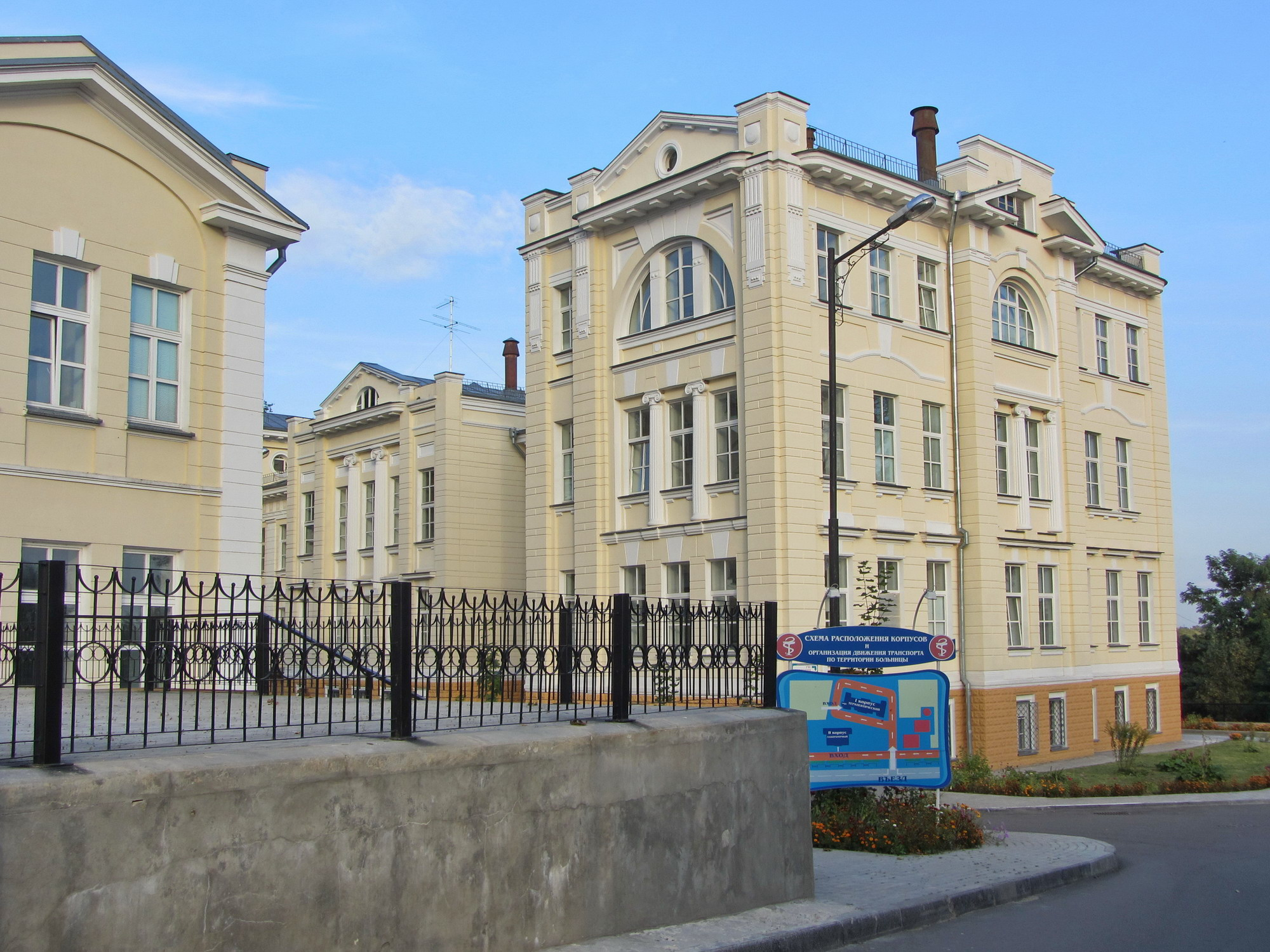
Building of the former district hospital

== Later life ==
Šabunieŭski had frictions with the Communist authorities immediately after the Russian Revolution but was able to resume his professional activities under the new government. In the 1920s, he worked as a provincial architect and district engineer. He managed a drainage project in Gomel, the construction of the city's water supply and restored the parts of the Gomel Palace damaged by fire in 1919.

In 1937, Šabunieŭski was arrested on trumped-up charges and sentenced to 10 years in the Gulag. He died in the same year at the age of 69 as a forced labourer at the construction of the infamous White Sea–Baltic Canal.

He was posthumously exonerated during Gorbachev's Perestroika in 1989. In December 2018, Šabunieŭski was named an honorary citizen of Gomel in recognition of his contribution to the city.

== Further information ==
«Рэпрэсаваная архітэктура», д/ф, рэж. Марыя Булавінская, 2019 г., Беларусь [Repressed Architecture, documentary directed by Marya Bulavinskaja, 2019, Belarus] (in Belarusian)
