= Babruysk =

City in Mogilev Region, Belarus

Babruysk Бабруйск • Бобруйск Bobruysk
- City
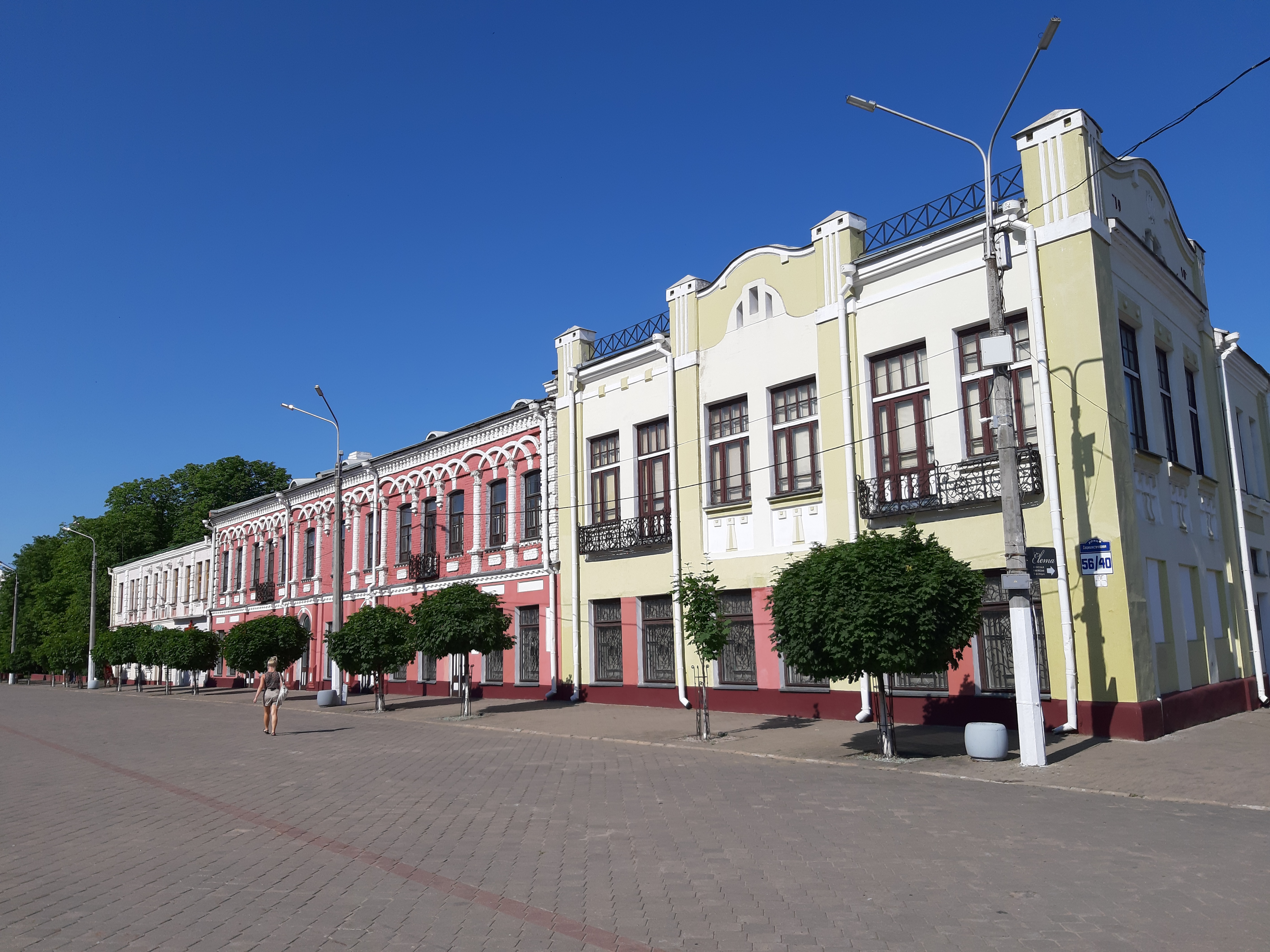
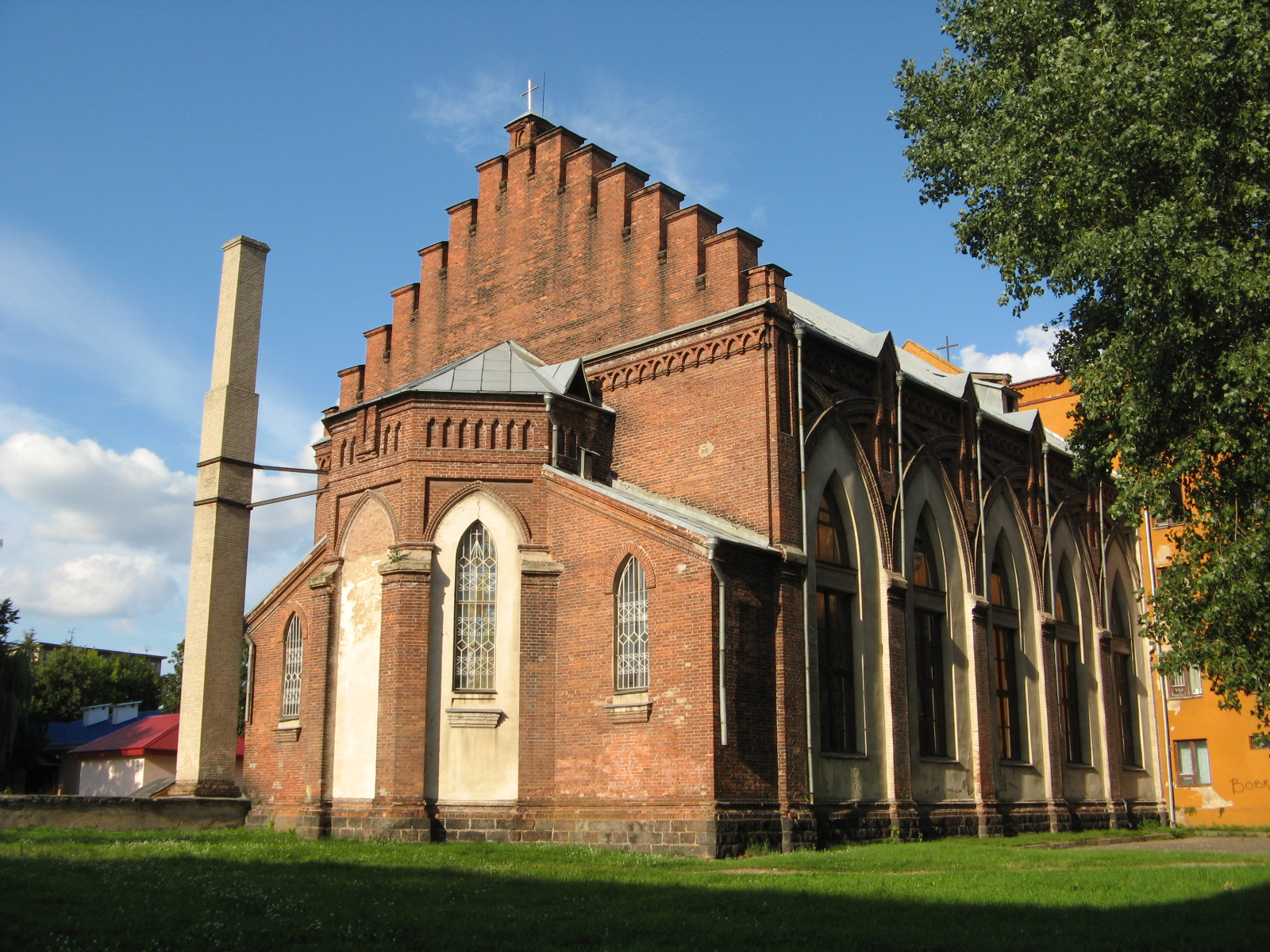
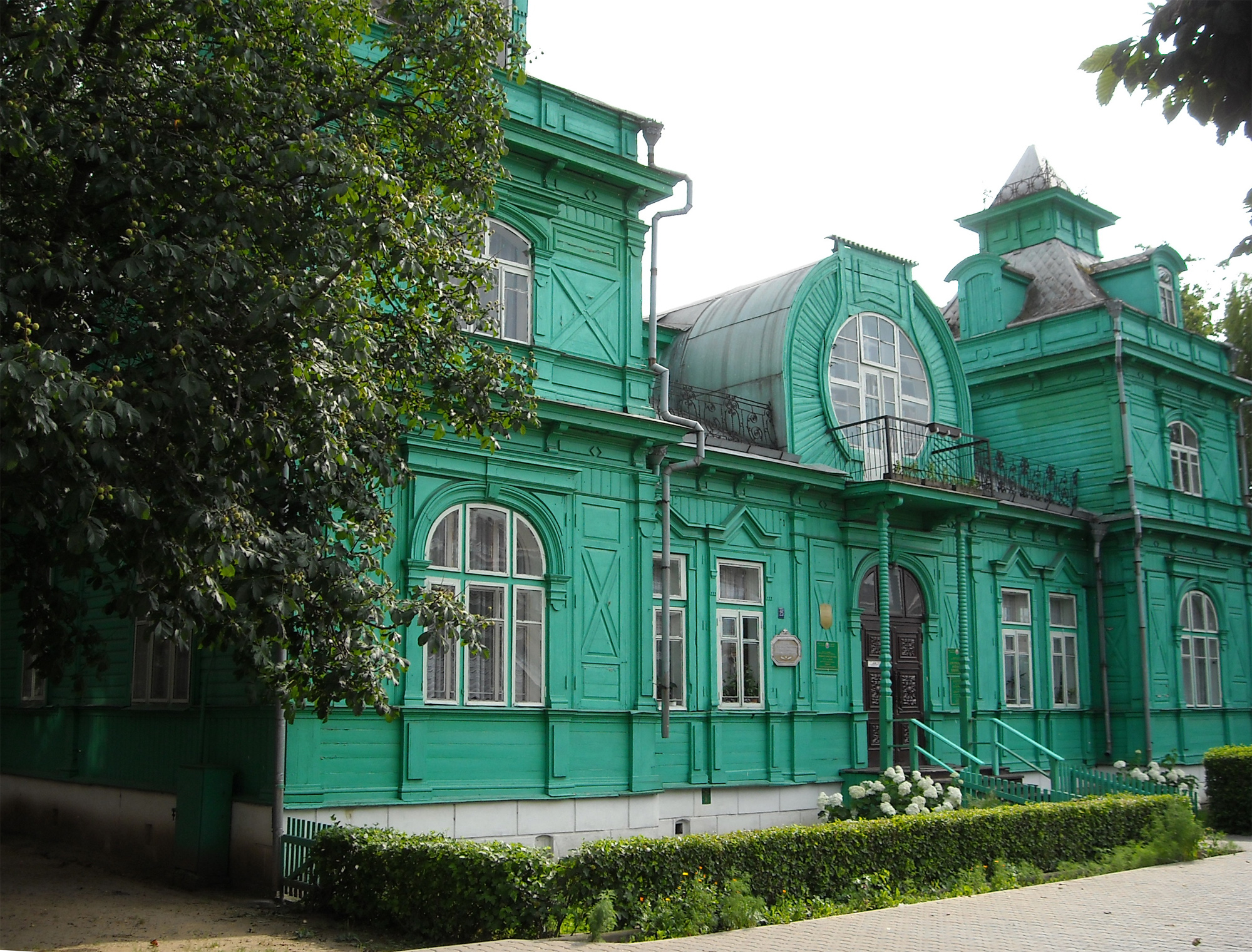
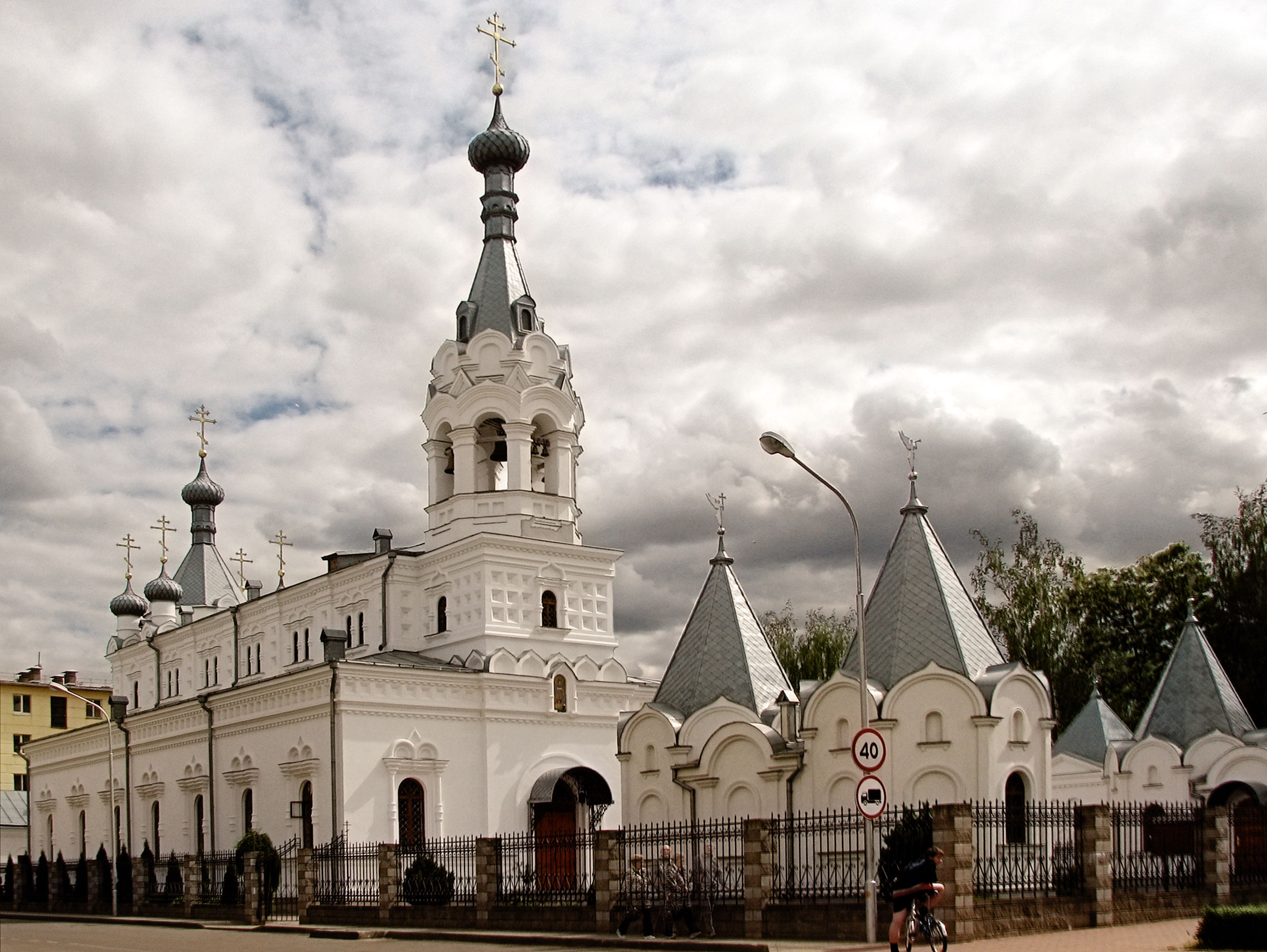
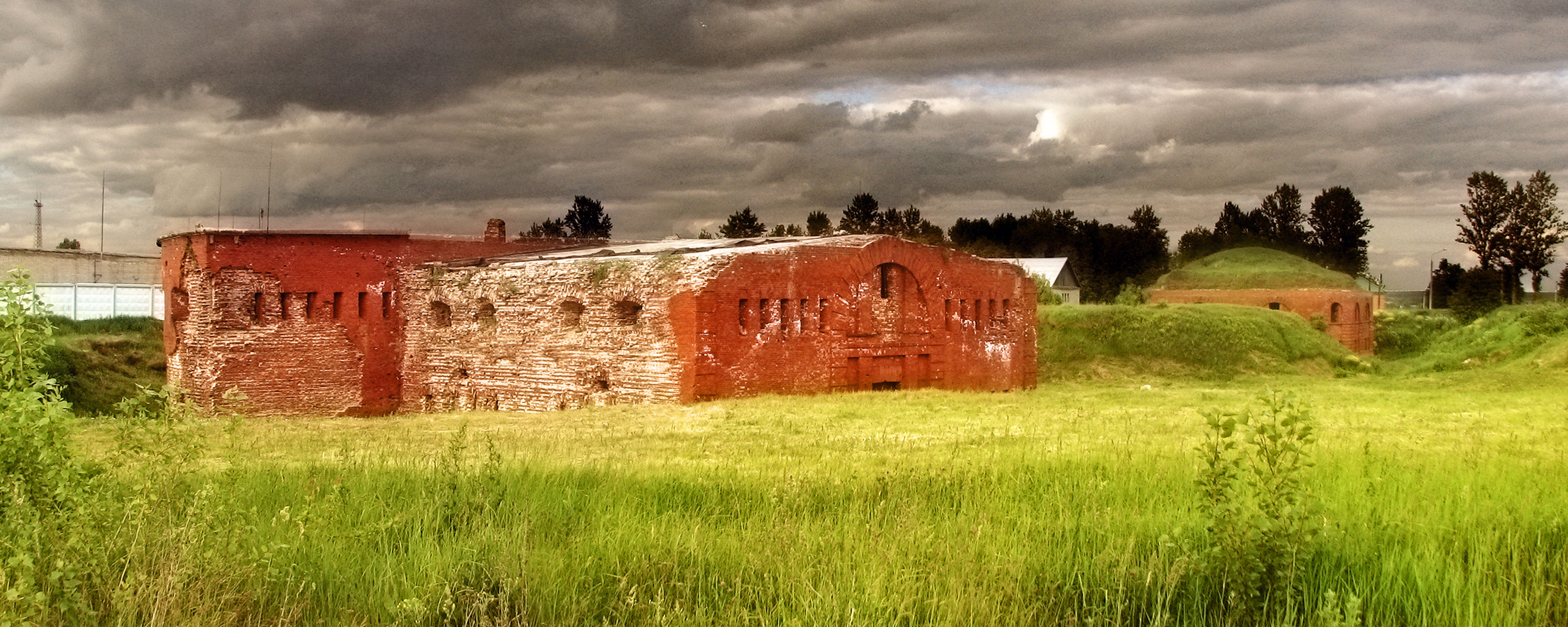
- Sacyjalistyčnaja Street Immaculate Conception Church Old library building Saint George Orthodox church Babruysk fortress

- Flag Coat of arms

- Location within Belarus
- Coordinates: 53°09′N 29°14′E
- Country: Belarus
- Region: Mogilev Region
- First mentioned: 1387

Government
  - Mayor: Aleksandr Studnev

Area
  - Total: 83.86 km^{2} (32.38 sq mi)
- Elevation: 157 m (515 ft)

Population (2025)
  - Total: 205,502
  - Density: 2,451/km^{2} (6,347/sq mi)
- Time zone: UTC+3 (MSK)
- Postal code: 213801-213830
- Area code: +375 0225(1)
- Vehicle registration: 6
- Website: bobruisk.by

Babruysk or Bobruysk (Note: Belarusian: Бабруйск, romanized: Babrujsk, IPA: [baˈbrujsk]; Russian: Бобруйск, IPA: [bɐˈbrujsk]; Yiddish: באָברויסק, romanized: Bobroysk, IPA: [bɔˈbrɔɪsk].) is a city in Mogilev Region, Belarus. It serves as the administrative center of Babruysk District, though it is administratively separated from the district. It is situated on the Berezina River. Babruysk occupies an area of 66 square kilometres (25 sq mi), and comprises over 450 streets whose combined length stretches for over 430 km (267 mi). As of 2025, it has a population of 205,502.

Historical population
Year	Pop.	±%
1897	34,336	—
1923	33,015	−3.8%
1926	39,280	+19.0%
1939	84,078	+114.0%
1959	97,530	+16.0%
1970	137,536	+41.0%
1979	192,207	+39.8%
1989	221,166	+15.1%
1999	220,700	−0.2%
2009	215,092	−2.5%
2019	212,283	−1.3%
2024	207,351	−2.3%
2025	205,502	−0.9%
Source: pop-stat.mashke.org

Babruysk is located at the intersection of railroads to Asipovichy, Zhlobin, Aktsyabrski and roads to Minsk, Gomel, Mogilev, Kalinkavichy, Slutsk, and Rahachow. It has the largest timber mill in Belarus and is known for its chemical, machine building, and metal-working industries.

In 2021, there were 38 public schools in Babruysk with over 24,000 students. There are three schools specializing in music, dance and visual arts. In addition, there is a medical school and numerous professional technical schools.

== Etymology ==
The name Babruysk (as well as that of the Babruyka River) may originate from the Belarusian word babyor (бабёр, lit. 'beaver') for beavers that inhabited the Berezina. However, by the end of the 19th century, beavers were almost eliminated due to hunting and pollution.

== History ==
Babruysk is one of the oldest cities in Belarus. It was first mentioned in writing in the middle of the 14th century. Investigations by archaeologists revealed that in the 5th and 6th centuries there existed Slavic settlements up the river Biarezina from where Babruysk is currently located; findings of stone tools and weapons suggest that people have lived in the area since the Stone Age.

During the reign of Vladimir I, Prince of Kiev, in place of modern-day Babruysk there was a village whose inhabitants were occupied with fishing and beaver trapping. This is where the name Babruysk originated. For many centuries Babruysk was part of the Polish–Lithuanian Commonwealth and was an important militarily fortified border post. In the 14th century a castle was built on one of the hills near the Berezina River.

Babruysk was not only a major military base, but also a prominent trade center. There is evidence of a market containing nearly one hundred stalls, which implies significant financial activity. In the first half of the 17th century Babruysk became a big trade outpost thanks to its strategic position at the intersection of major trade routes and the Berezina river. There was a flowering of skilled tradesmen, including carpenters, blacksmiths, goldsmiths, and bakers. The population in the first half of the 17th century was between 2,000 and 5,000 people.

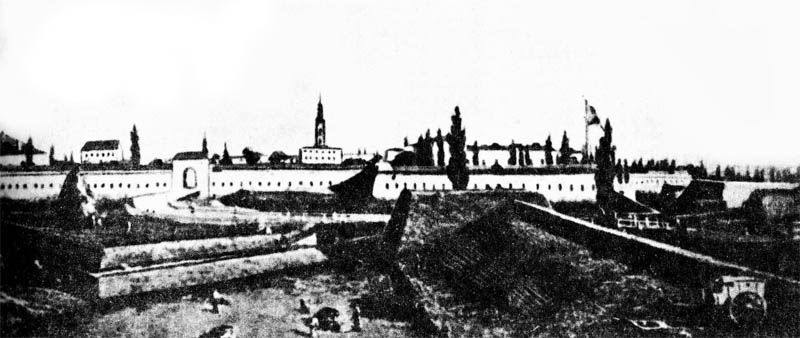
Babruysk fortress in 1811

The town was surrounded by fortifications made from wood and earth, whose length stretched for over 3 km (2 mi). These included a protective earth barrier, wooden walls, and almost a dozen two-story watchtowers. In the walls there were openings designed for the placement of firearms. After the Second Partition of Poland in 1793 it came into the hands of Imperial Russia. In 1810, the construction of a fortress began to mark the border between Russia and Austria and Prussia; in 1812 it was almost completed and was successful in repelling Napoleon's attack for four months. After the war the building was renewed on a large scale, and it was completed in 1820. That was one of the western Russian fortresses. The Babruysk fortress has served its purpose for many decades and today it is a major tourist attraction.

The 1861 census showed a population of 15,766. The ethnic groups living in Babruysk included Belarusians, Ukrainians, Poles, and Jews. As in other cities of Belarus, most of the buildings were constructed from wood. In 1866 there were 1498 houses, only 29 of which were made from brick.

There was a steady increase in the Jewish population of Babruysk following the Napoleonic Wars. By 1897, in the population of 34,336 citizens, 60%, or 20,760 were Jews. Most of them were employed in crafts, industry, and trade.

During the 1890s, the citizens of Babruysk witnessed pogroms after the assassination of the Russian emperor Alexander II. Many of the attacks were repelled by armed Jewish self-defense.

In 1902, the Great Fire of Babruysk left 2,500 families homeless and destroyed over 250 businesses, 15 schools and the market. There were more than 7 million rubles in property damage. However, the city was quickly rebuilt, this time with brick and stone.

In 1904 the 40th Infantry Division of the Imperial Russian Army had its headquarters here.

Between February 2 and March 11, 1918, was a Battle of Bobrujsk, between units of the Polish I Corps in Russia, commanded by General Jozef Dowbor-Musnicki, fought with the Red Army over the control of the city and region of Babruysk.

In 1918–1920, the town was captured by Polish forces.

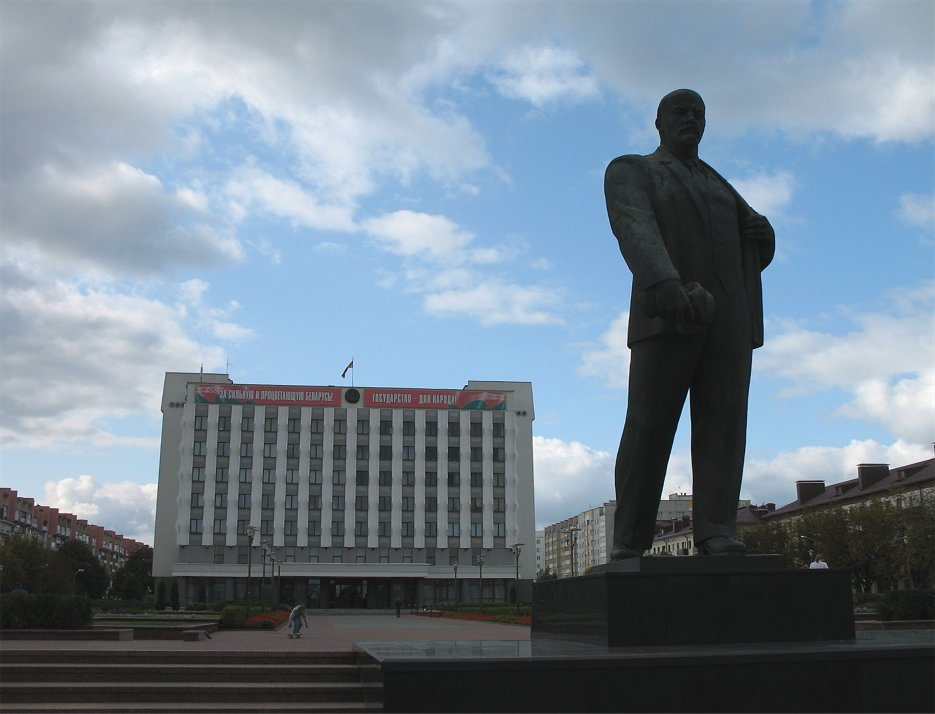
Babruysk City Hall and Lenin statue

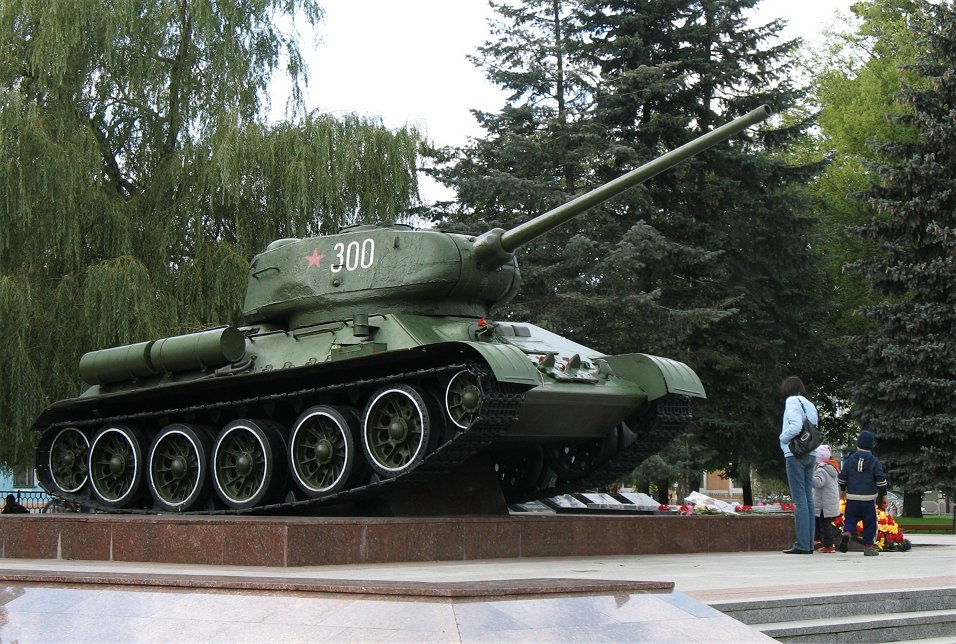
T-34 tank on a podium in downtown Babruysk

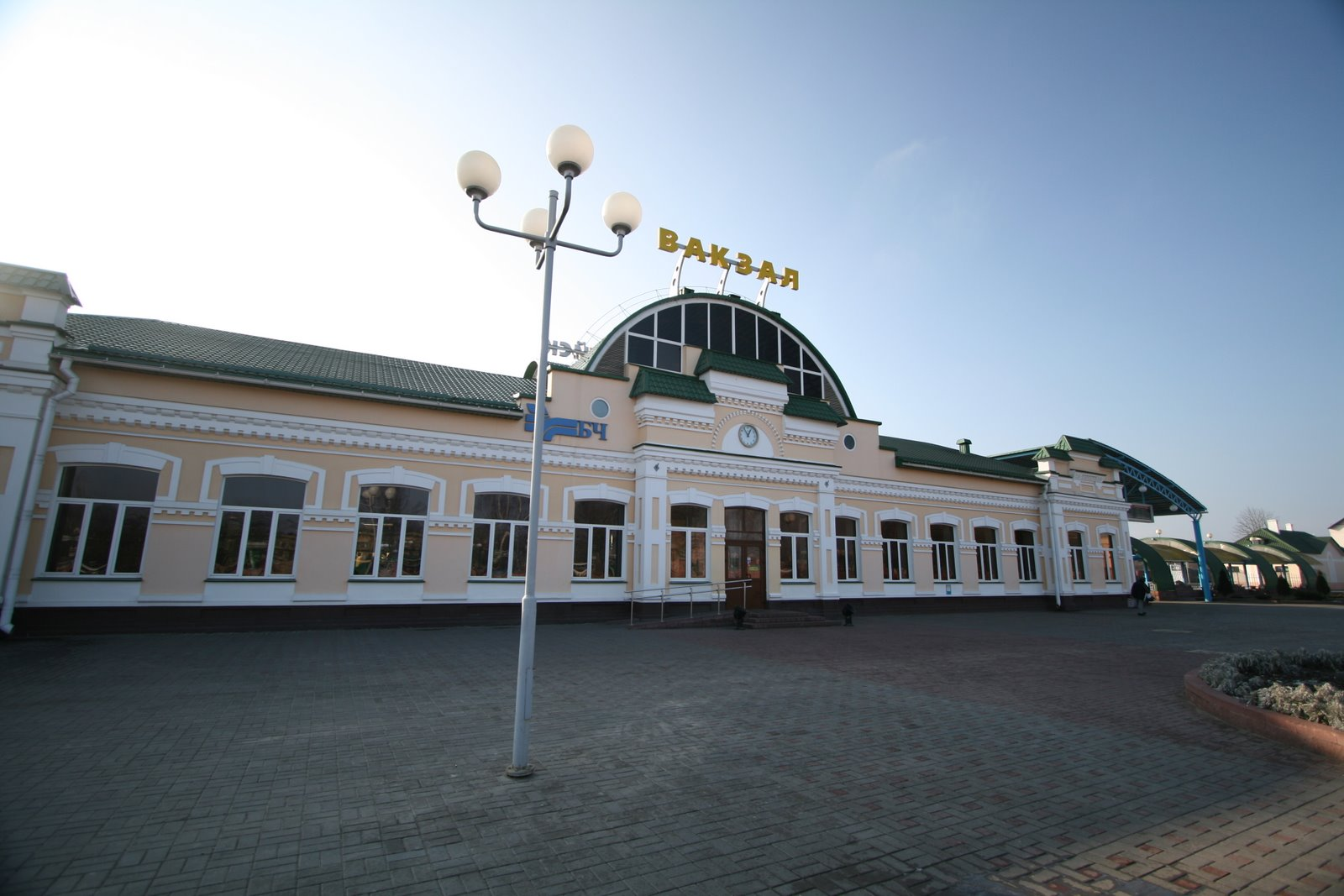
Babruysk railway station

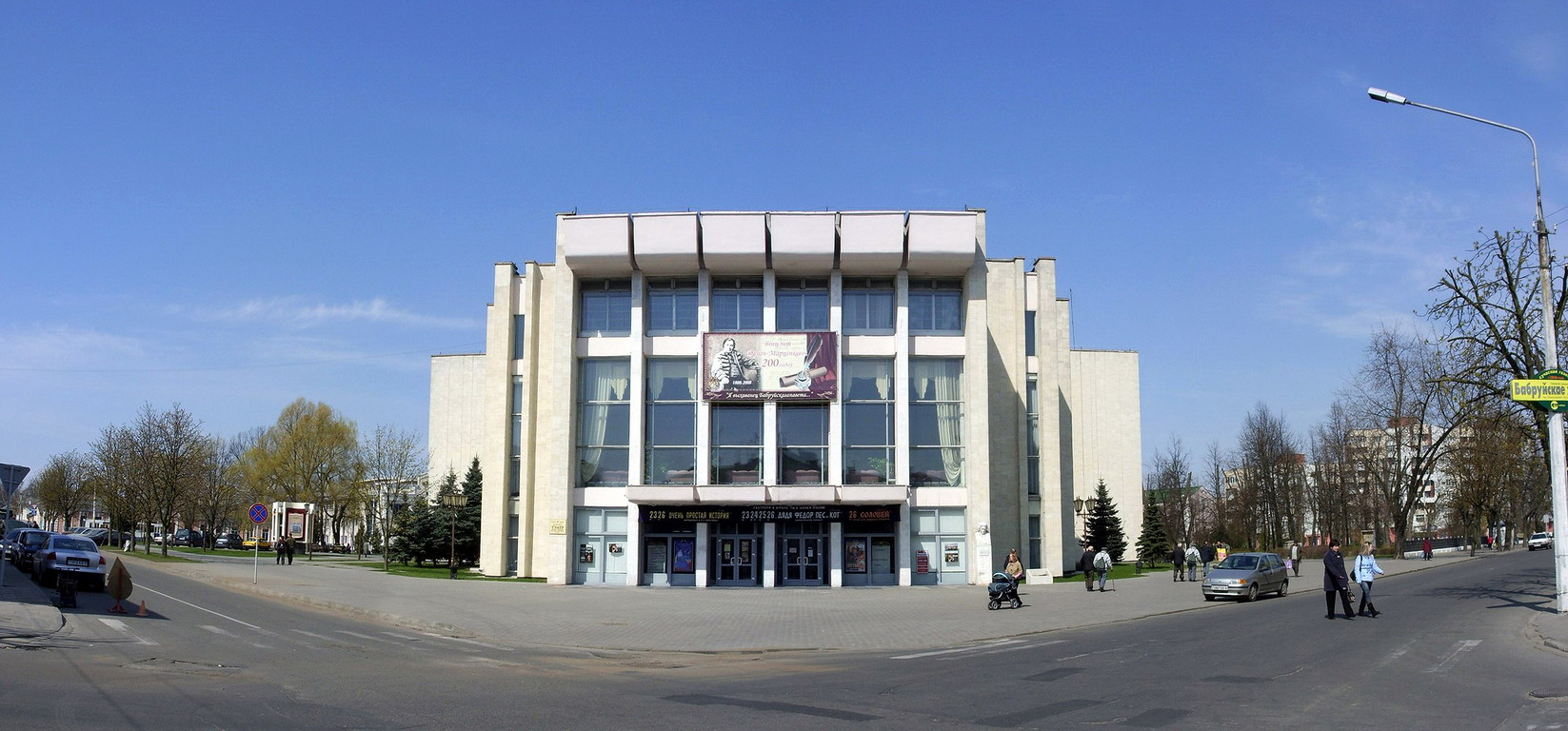
Bobruisk Drama and Comedy Theatre

=== World War II ===
On June 28, 1941, troops of the German Army Group Centre captured Babruysk. General Gotthard Heinrici considered the largely-evacuated city "a dump consisting mainly of wooden houses" and was appalled by the "extremely primitive" surrounding area. Dulag 131, one of the largest camps for Soviet prisoners of war, was located in the "citadel". An estimated 30,000 to 40,000 Red Army soldiers died there.

Believing that German troops would not target civilians, many Jews stayed behind. Consequently, 20,000 Babruysk Jews were shot and buried in mass graves. Ghetto and labor camps were established in the southwest part of town. The conditions inside the camps were horrible and involved lack of food, lack of sanitation and perpetual abuse by the Nazi guards. Soon the Nazis began executing the Jews in the ghetto in groups of about 30. By 1943 all labor camps had been liquidated and the remaining Jews killed. The few Jews who escaped joined partisan forces in the surrounding forest and went about attacking enemy railroad lines. There is a small memorial dedicated to the memory of Babruysk Jews killed in the Holocaust, located in the Nahalat Yitzhak cemetery, Giv'atayim, Israel, as part of the Babi Yar memorial.

On June 29, 1944, the Red Army liberated Babruysk. The city lay in ruins; while the population had been 84,107 in 1939, it was down to 28,352 following the war. The difficult process of rebuilding was conducted by thousands of workers and war prisoners who labored to clear factories and streets of rubble and filled in craters made by the bombardment. The machine building plant had been almost completely destroyed, but was restored to working order by the end of 1944. Many other factories and facilities were also rebuilt.

=== Postwar era ===
Between 1944 and 1954, Babruysk served as an administrative center of Babruysk Voblast.

The population recovered swiftly as well. In 1959 it was 96,000, in 1965 – 116,000, in 1968 – 122,500, in 1970 – 136,000 and by 1989, 232,000 people were living in Babruysk. This was mostly due to urbanization, where people moved into the city from the surrounding rural areas.

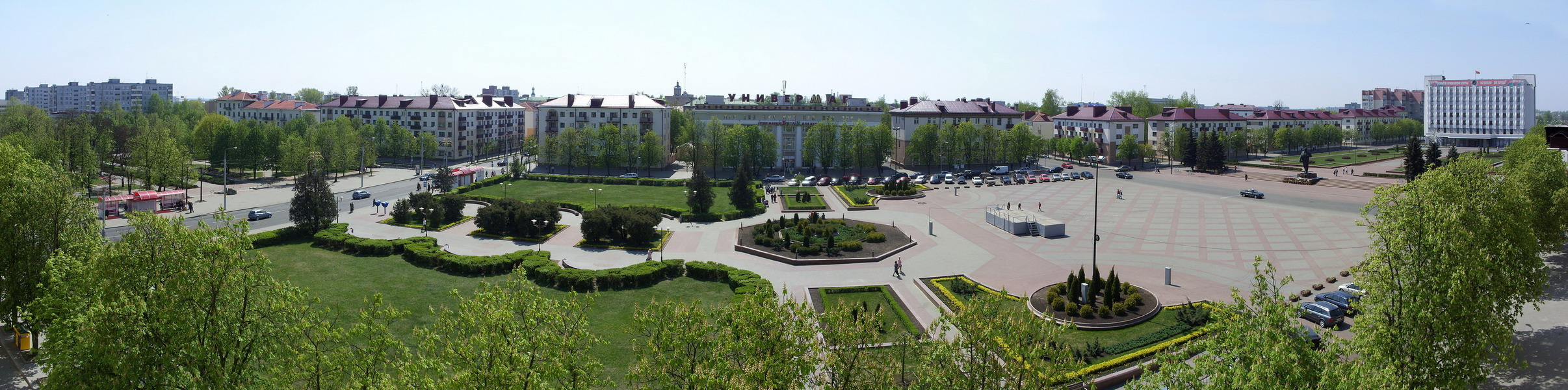
Lenin Square

== Climate ==
This climatic region is typified by large seasonal temperature differences, with warm to hot (and often humid) summers and cold (sometimes severely cold) winters. According to the Köppen Climate Classification system, Babruysk has a humid continental climate, abbreviated "Dfb" on climate maps.

Climate data for Babruysk (1991–2020, extremes 1901–present)
Month	Jan	Feb	Mar	Apr	May	Jun	Jul	Aug	Sep	Oct	Nov	Dec	Year
Record high °C (°F)	10.3 (50.5)	14.9 (58.8)	25.7 (78.3)	28.6 (83.5)	31.7 (89.1)	35.3 (95.5)	35.3 (95.5)	38.0 (100.4)	33.1 (91.6)	26.1 (79.0)	17.5 (63.5)	12.0 (53.6)	38.0 (100.4)
Mean daily maximum °C (°F)	−2.0 (28.4)	−0.7 (30.7)	5.1 (41.2)	13.6 (56.5)	19.6 (67.3)	23.0 (73.4)	25.1 (77.2)	24.3 (75.7)	18.3 (64.9)	11.1 (52.0)	3.7 (38.7)	−0.7 (30.7)	11.7 (53.1)
Daily mean °C (°F)	−4.4 (24.1)	−3.8 (25.2)	0.6 (33.1)	7.7 (45.9)	13.4 (56.1)	17.0 (62.6)	18.8 (65.8)	17.8 (64.0)	12.4 (54.3)	6.7 (44.1)	1.3 (34.3)	−2.9 (26.8)	7.1 (44.8)
Mean daily minimum °C (°F)	−7 (19)	−6.9 (19.6)	−3.4 (25.9)	2.1 (35.8)	7.2 (45.0)	10.9 (51.6)	12.8 (55.0)	11.7 (53.1)	7.3 (45.1)	2.8 (37.0)	−1.1 (30.0)	−5.1 (22.8)	2.6 (36.7)
Record low °C (°F)	−37.4 (−35.3)	−36 (−33)	−29.3 (−20.7)	−9.7 (14.5)	−4 (25)	−1.3 (29.7)	3.3 (37.9)	1.0 (33.8)	−4.7 (23.5)	−12.5 (9.5)	−23.8 (−10.8)	−30.6 (−23.1)	−37.4 (−35.3)
Average precipitation mm (inches)	40 (1.6)	38 (1.5)	39 (1.5)	41 (1.6)	61 (2.4)	76 (3.0)	89 (3.5)	55 (2.2)	48 (1.9)	57 (2.2)	45 (1.8)	44 (1.7)	633 (24.9)
Average extreme snow depth cm (inches)	9 (3.5)	12 (4.7)	9 (3.5)	0 (0)	0 (0)	0 (0)	0 (0)	0 (0)	0 (0)	0 (0)	2 (0.8)	6 (2.4)	12 (4.7)
Average rainy days	7	6	9	12	14	15	15	12	14	13	13	10	140
Average snowy days	18	17	12	3	0.2	0	0	0	0	2	10	18	80
Average relative humidity (%)	86	83	78	69	68	73	74	75	80	83	88	88	79
Source: Pogoda.ru.net

== Notable people ==
- Abba Ahimeir (November 2, 1897 – June 6, 1962), Jewish journalist, historian, maximalist ideologue and activist of Zionist Revisionist Movement
- Andrei Arlovski (born 1979), former UFC heavyweight champion.
- Bi-2 rock band (Russia): both founders are from Babruysk.
- Maxim Neafit Bujnicki (born 1981), Ukrainian film director and screenwriter
- Cheev (born 1993), Belarusian-Ukrainian singer and songwriter
- Eliyahu Dobkin (December 31, 1898 – October 26, 1976), Labor Zionist leader, signatory of Israeli declaration of independence, a founder of the Israel Museum, active in the Jewish Agency and the Zionist Organization.
- Celia Dropkin (1887–1956), American Yiddish poet
- Arkadi Duchin (born 1963), Israeli singer-songwriter and musical producer
- Baruch Epstein (1860–1941), Lithuanian rabbi, son of Rabbi Yechiel Michel Epstein. Best known for Temimah commentary on the Torah.
- Yechiel Michel Epstein (January 24, 1829 – February 24, 1908), rabbi and authority in Jewish law in Lithuania, known for his book Aruch HaShulchan.
- Joshua Louis Goldberg (1896–1994), American rabbi, first rabbi commissioned as U.S. Navy chaplain in WWII, third to serve in the Navy, first to reach the rank of Navy Captain, first to retire after full active-duty career
- Zalman Gorelik (1908–1987), geologist (tectonics specialist)
- Avraham Katznelson (1888–1956), Zionist politician in Mandate Palestine, signatory of the Israeli declaration of independence
- Berl Katznelson (1887–1944), chief figure in Labor Zionism, instrumental to the establishment of the modern state of Israel
- Rachel Katznelson-Shazar (1885–1975), Zionist activist, wife of Zalman Shazar, the third President of Israel
- Ruslan Kogan (born 1982), Australian entrepreneur and self-made millionaire
- Michaš Kukabaka (1936), Soviet Belarusian dissident described as „the last Soviet political prisoner in the USSR“
- Aaron Lebedeff (1873–1960), Yiddish theater star, singer
- Kadish Luz (1895–1972), Israeli Minister of Agriculture (1955–1959), Speaker of the Knesset (1959–1969), acting president for one month in 1963
- Alexander Mikhailovich Orlov (born Leiba L. Feldbin; 1895-1973), Soviet secret police colonel, NKVD Rezident in Second Spanish Republic, avoided execution in 1938 by fleeing to the USA.
- Grigory Nemtsov (1948–2010), Latvian journalist and politician
- Yelena Piskun (born 1978), two-time world champion in artistic gymnastics
- Dovid Raskin (1927–2011), rabbi associated with the Chabad-Lubavitch Hasidic movement
- Ilia Rodov, Israeli art historian
- Efraim Sevela (1928–2010), Soviet writer, screenwriter, director, and producer. Emigrated from the Soviet Union to Israel, then to the United States and Russia.
- Shmaryahu Noah Schneersohn, chassidic rabbi
- David Shimoni (1891–1956), Israeli poet, writer and translator
- Eliyahu Simpson (1889–1976), rabbi
- Yitzhak Tabenkin (1888–1971), Zionist activist and politician, co-founder of the Kibbutz Movement
- Yosef Tunkel (1881–1949), Jewish–Belarusian–American writer of poetry and humorous prose in Yiddish
- Gary Vaynerchuk (born 1975), serial entrepreneur, CEO, investor, author, public speaker
- Avraam Zak (1829–1893), Russian-Jewish banker and philanthropist

== International relations ==
Babruysk is twinned with:

- Anenii Noi, Comrat - Moldova
- Batumi, Kobuleti - Georgia
- Daugavpils, Gulbene - Latvia
- Grozny, Ishim, Kolpino, Kostroma, Luga, Murom, Naro-Fominsky District, Novomoskovsk, Petrogradsky (Saint Petersburg), Sokolniki (Moscow), Vladimir - Russia
- Hengyang, Shaoxing, Wuxi - China
- Iglesias, Italy
- Morogoro, Tanzania
- Odense, Denmark
- Öskemen, Kazakhstan
- Púchov, Slovakia
- Samarkand, Uzbekistan
- Sevlievo, Bulgaria
- Talin, Armenia
- Warsaw West County, Poland

== Places of interest ==
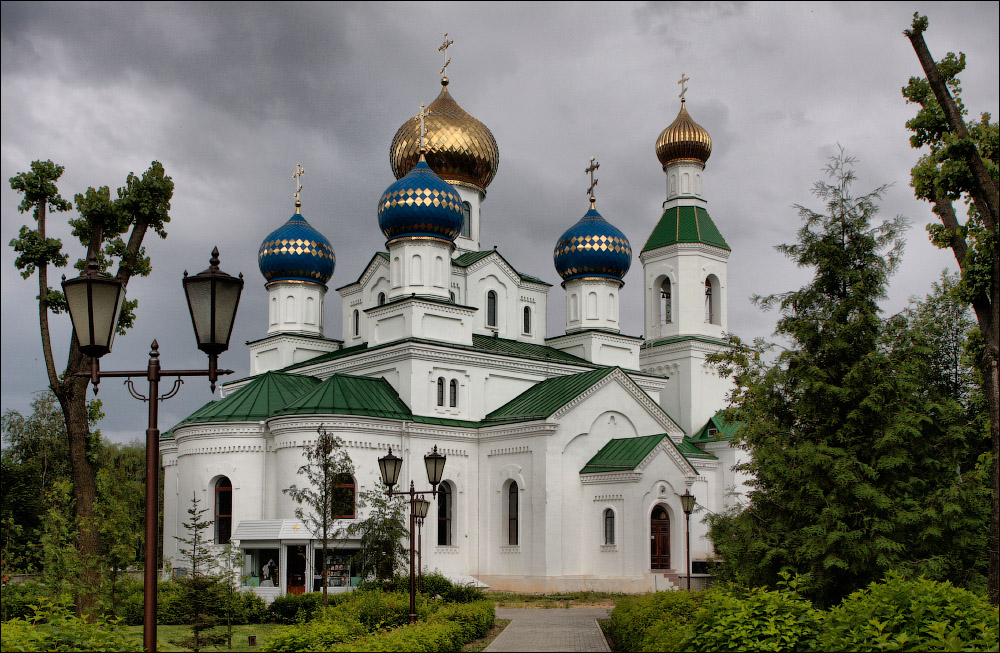
The recently (2006–2009) rebuilt Orthodox St. Nicholas Cathedral

- Church of the Immaculate Conception of Saint Virgin Mary, a Catholic church built between 1901 and 1903;
- The Babruysk fortress, 1810–1836;
- Katsnelson House, 1912;
- The Church of Saint Nicholas (Babruysk), 1892–1894;
- The Saint George Orthodox church in Babruysk, 1905–1907.

== In popular culture ==
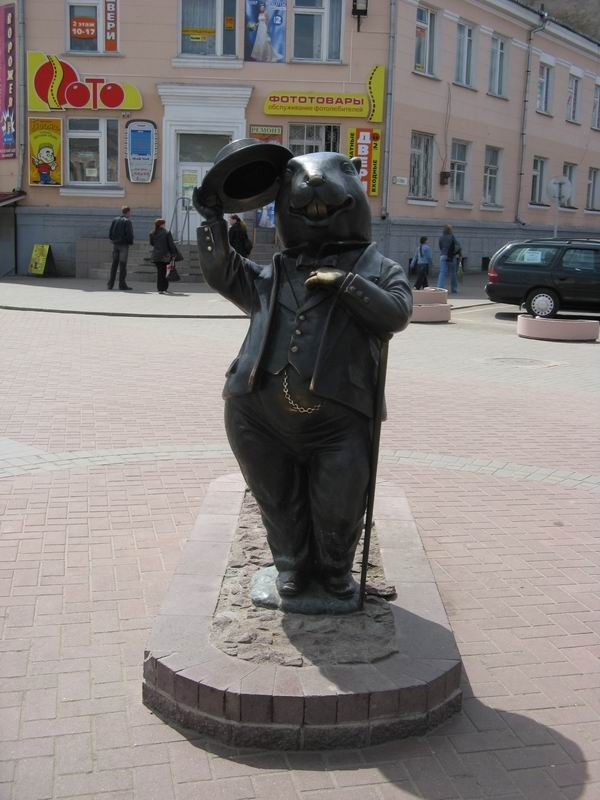
A beaver, the symbol of the city, which can be found in its center.

- The city was mentioned in Ilf and Petrov's book The Little Golden Calf as "a wonderful, highly civilized place".

“You think I’m stupid!” shrieked Panikovsky. “Give me Central Russia, then I’ll sign the pact.”

“What? The entire Center?” mocked Balaganov. “Would you also like Melitopol on top of that? Or Bobruisk?”

At the word Bobruisk, the children moaned painfully. Everyone was prepared to go to Bobruisk immediately. Bobruisk was considered a wonderful, highly civilized place.

- 'Go to Babrujsk, animal' (Ф Бабруйск, жывотнайе) was a popular meme from padonkaffsky jargon, popular in the Russian-speaking segment of the Internet in the early 2000s. Its origin could be a reference to the quote from The Little Golden Calf.
- In the Star Trek: The Next Generation episode titled "Family", there is an Earth Station Bobruisk, named for the city in Belarus.
- In Tanki Online there is a map titled Bobruisk loosely based on the city.
- Popular travel vlogger Bald and Bankrupt featured Babruysk in a video entitled "Back To The USSR | Lost In The Belarus Provinces".
