= Avraam Zak =

Russian, philanthropist, and public figure

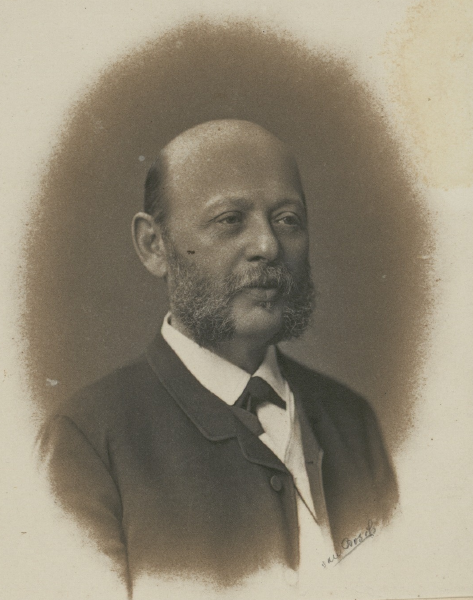
A photograph of Avraam.

Avraam Isakovich Zak (1829–1893; last name also spelled Sack) was a Russian banker, philanthropist, and public figure.

== Early life ==
Zak was born to a well-established family in Bobruisk (now in Belarus) in 1829. Zak was self-taught in mathematics and later in economics, and exhibited an interest in both Hebrew literature and music. In addition, during his childhood, Zak might have been influenced by the local maskilim, or supporters of the Haskalah (European Jewish enlightenment).

== Career ==
Zak began his career working for Baron Evzel Ginsburg, first working as a clerk in the liquor store business, working as Ginsburg's chief accountant, and then working for Baron Ginsburg's bank in Petrograd (St. Petersburg). In 1871, Zak became the director of the Petersburg Discount Lending Bank, owned by Leopold Kronenberg (who was also Jewish); this bank emerged became one of the largest banks in Russia under Zak's leadership. Also, Zak helped build one of Russia's first railroads and built the Libavo–Romni track line, thus allowing development to occur in northwestern Russia. Due to his deep knowledge of economics, the Russian government sometimes consulted with Zak on economic matters, such as how to prevent a severe financial crisis in the event of war (Zak suggested having the Russian treasury accumulate gold reserves). Zak was offered the position of Deputy Finance Minister of Russia on condition that he converted to Christianity, but he rejected this offer.

Throughout his life, Zak supported various Jewish organizations in Petrograd (Saint Petersburg) as well as the city's Jewish orphanage and Jewish school. Also, Zak's home in Petrograd was a popular place for various critics and musicians such as Anton Rubinstein (who was born Jewish). In addition, one of Zak's most notable acts was to pay the legal fees of Georgian Jews in Kutaisi who were accused of blood libel in 1878-1879.

== Death ==
Avraam Zak died in Hessen, Germany in 1893 while he was travelling abroad for medical treatment. He was either 63 or 64 years old at the time of his death.
