= Michaš Kukabaka =

- Міхась Кукабака
- Born: 1936 (age 89–90); Babruisk, Byelorussian SSR, Soviet Union
- Known for: Soviet Belarusian dissident

Michaš Kukabaka (also known as Mikhail Kukobaka; born 1936) is a Soviet Belarusian dissident described as "the last Soviet political prisoner in the USSR".

== Early years ==
Kukabaka was born in Babrujsk, Soviet Belarus. He grew up in an orphanage, as his father was killed during World War II, and his mother died after the war. He graduated from a vocational school.

== Dissident activities ==
In 1968, he publicly declared his disagreement with the invasion of Czechoslovakia by the Soviet and Warsaw Pact troops and handed over his article condemning the invasion to the Deputy Consul General of Czechoslovakia asking him to forward it to the West.

He was the author of a number of publications that were distributed by samizdat in the 1970s. His signatures were under numerous human rights documents of this time. In 1977, he announced the renunciation of his Soviet citizenship.

In 1978 he wrote an essay The Stolen Fatherland, dedicated to the ongoing russification of Soviet Belarus. The essay was smuggled to the West, read out by the radio station Deutsche Welle and published in various émigré publications. For this essay, Kukabaka was accused by the Soviet authorities of distorting "Leninist national policy."

== Persecution and support ==
Kukabaka was first arrested in 1970 and endured a total of approximately 17 years in prisons, compulsory mental hospitals and labour camps. He refused to write petitions for clemency.

Academician Andrei Sakharov did a lot to inform the public and assess the situation of Kukabaka, with other Soviet dissidents Viktor Nekipelov, Grigory Podyapolsky and Maria Petrenko also expressing their support.

A public campaign was organised in the West in defence of Kukabaka, with publications in the New York Times, and programmes by Radio Liberty. The Belarusian diaspora in the United States created the "Committee of Prisoners of Conscience in Belarus“, with the Belarusian diaspora in other countries also active in expressing their support. Trade unions in England and Denmark protested against his incarceration. US Congressman Bill Green highlighted Kukabaka's story in a special note addressed to the Congress, with Senator Robert Dole also supporting the prisoner.

== Release and life after it ==
In 1988 Kukabaka was the last prisoner convicted under the article "anti-Soviet agitation and propaganda". He was ultimately pardoned and released on 2 December of that year.

He continued his human rights activities after the dissolution of the Soviet Union and, in particular, was critical of the political regimes in Russia and Belarus.
