= Babruysk fortress =

Fortress in Babruysk, Belarus

Coordinates: 53°08′20″N 29°14′45″E

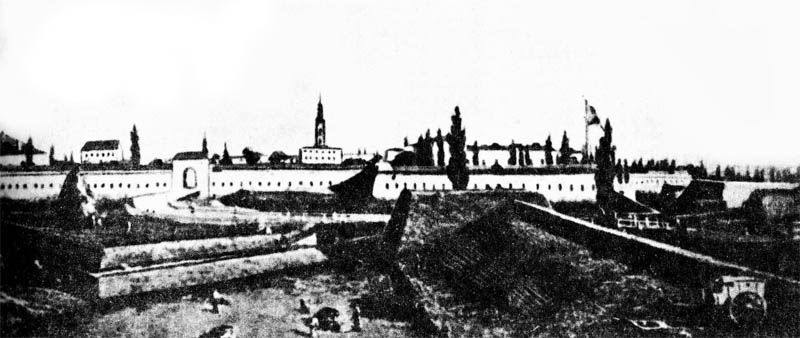
Babruysk fortress in 1811

Babruysk Fortress (Belarusian: Бабруйская крэпасць; Russian: Бобруйская крепость) is a historic fortress in the city of Babruysk, Belarus, that was built between 1810 and 1836. It is one of the best surviving examples of fortification architecture and design in the first half of the 19th century. The fortress was constructed in the historic center of the city, at the confluence of the Babruyka and Berezina rivers. It was one of the western Russian fortresses.

In 1810, Tsar Alexander I sent out his military engineer Teodor Narbutt to find a site suitable for building a fortress somewhere on the Dnieper, between Mogilev and Rogachev in order to prepare for the looming threat in Western Europe. However, after his investigation, Narbut advised his superiors that a more strategic position would be on the shore of the Berezina river near Babruysk. This decision was approved by the Chief of Military Engineers, Count Carl Operman, who at the time had authority over all of Russian forts. On June 4, 1810, the Tsar issued an order for the Babruysk fortress to be constructed. Narbut had to resign for health reasons and was replaced by General Major Gabriel Ignatiev.

The early fortress comprised five bastions, multiple soil ridges, and water channels. The basis for the Babruysk fortress was the Babruysk Jesuit house and a smaller Polish fortress, which were built earlier.

Only partially completed, the fortress had to face Napoleon's invading army in the summer of 1812. After the French army captured Minsk, General Ignatiev took command of the fort and the city of Babruysk, which served as a holdout for the retreating Russian forces. Soldiers from The Second Russian Army were provided with food and the wounded received medical treatment. After that they were ferried by the Berezina and Dniper to Smolensk, where the main Russian army was stationed. General Ignatiev remained in the fortress and oversaw its defence.

The city faced an attack by the forces of General Jan Henryk Dąbrowski, the Polish Corps Commander of Napoleon's Army. The siege lasted for four months, however the fortress held until the French forces began their retreat. Throughout this time Ignatiev was instrumental in collecting intelligence and forwarding it to the high command of the Russian army.

Following the Napoleonic Wars, in 1820, the fortress was further rapidly expanded by the addition of 18 more bastions and towers. The fort Freidrich Wilhelm was designed according to the plans of the architect A. Staubert in 1822. Tsar Alexander I himself and his brother arrived in Babruysk on September 24, 1825, at the completion of this building phase.

In 1892 the 1st Brigade of the 40th Infantry Division of the Imperial Russian Army was stationed here.

By 1900 the fortress lost its military significance and was converted into a jail. It was captured by the Polish I Corps in February 1918 and used by Polish forces during the Polish-Bolshevik War (1919—1920). During World War II, it was used as a concentration camp by German occupation forces (about 80,000 deaths).

The Babruysk Fortress was registered as a national architectural monument of Belarus.

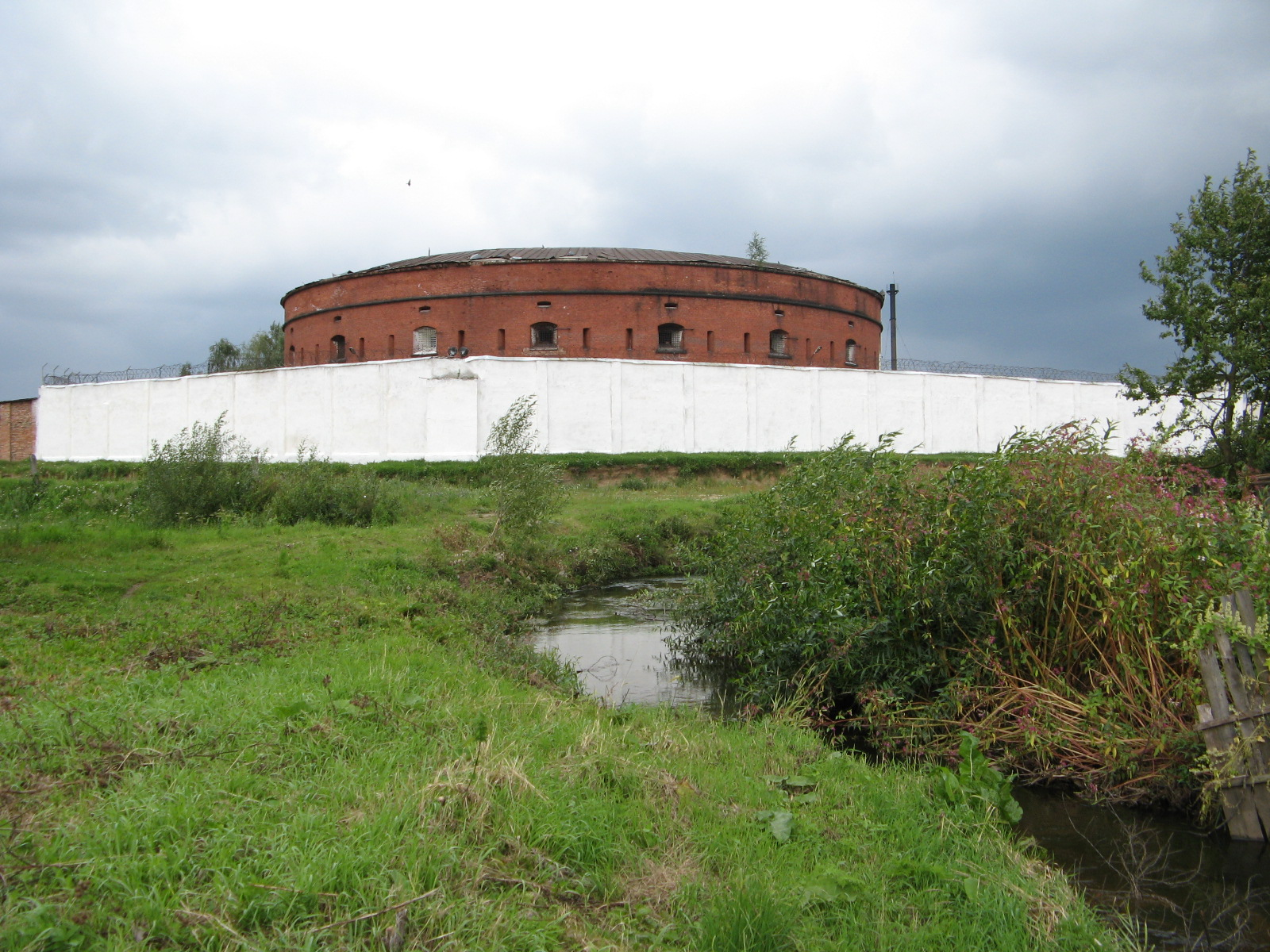
Babruysk Fortress with Babruysk River in foreground.

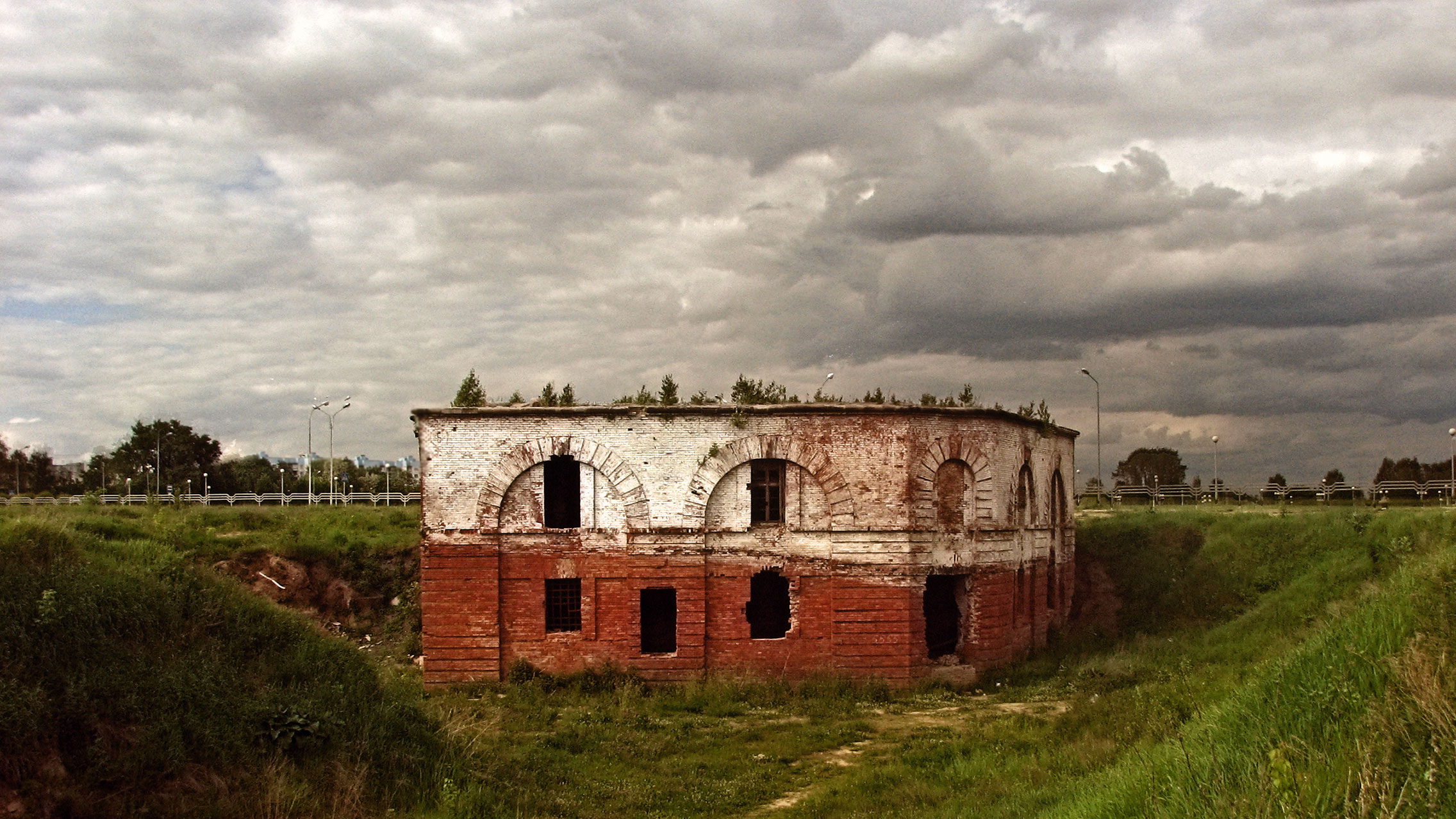
An old section of the Babruysk Fortress
