= Western Russian fortresses =

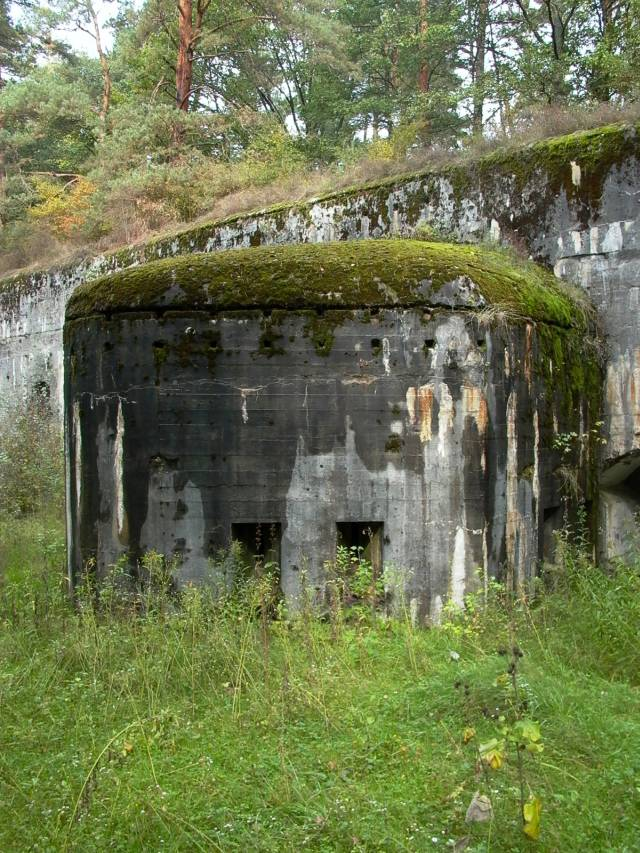
Russian bunker at St. George's Fortress in Nowy Dwór Mazowiecki, Poland.

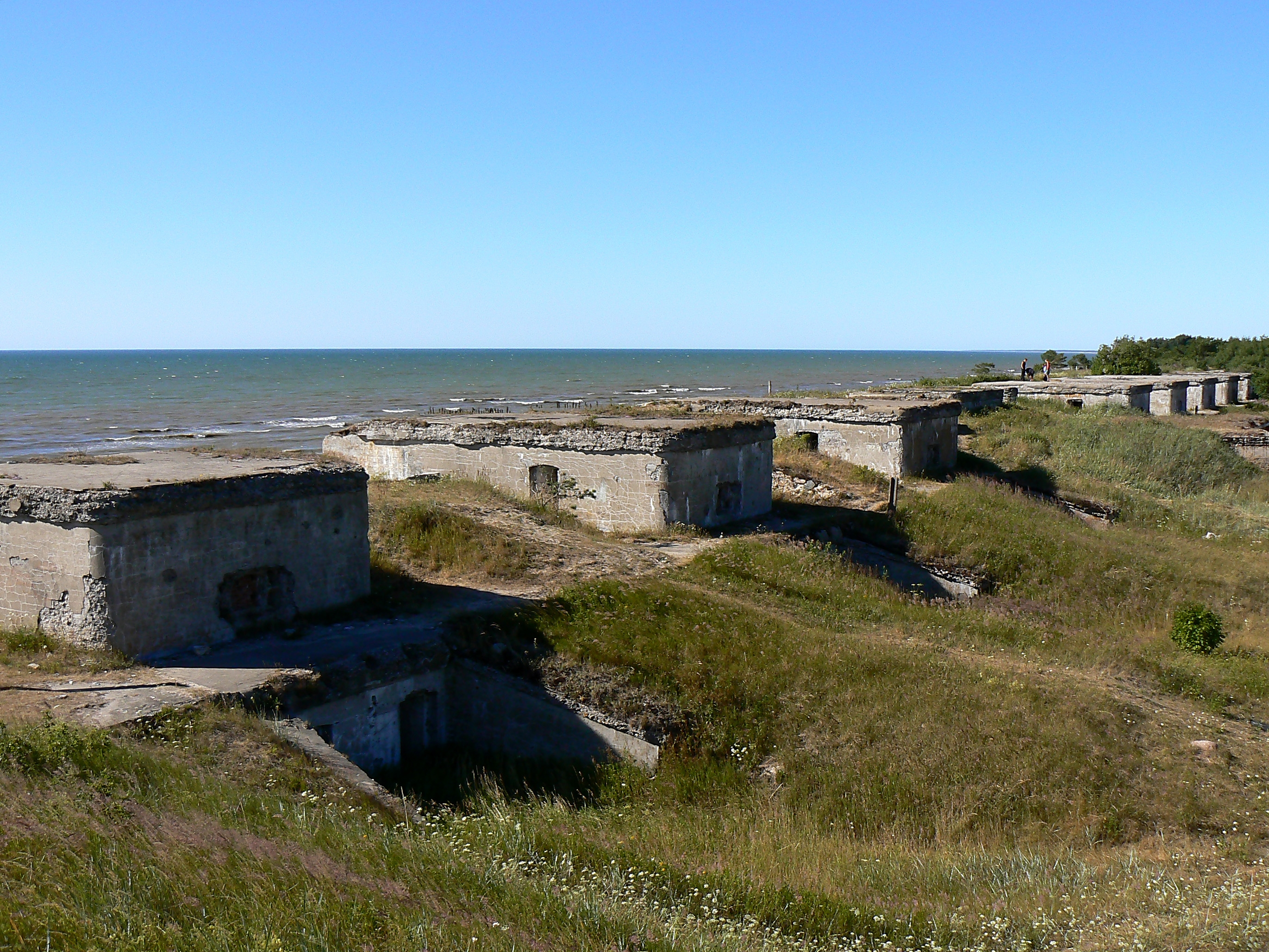
Libava Naval Fortress, a Russian naval fort near Liepāja, Latvia.

The Western Russian fortresses are a system of fortifications built by the Russian Empire in Eastern Europe in the early 19th century. The fortifications were constructed in three chains at strategic locations along Russia's western border, primarily to combat the threat of Prussia (later Germany) and Austria-Hungary, and to establish Russian rule in new western territories. By the late 19th century the fortifications were obsolete and the system became defunct by the collapse of the Russian Empire in 1917.

== 1830 Polish threat ==
During 1830–1831, the Russian Empire under the rule of Tsar Nicholas I crushed the November Uprising, a Polish revolt against Russian authority over the Kingdom of Poland, at the time Russia's westernmost territory that shared borders with other powerful European empires such as Austria-Hungary and Prussia. The Kingdom of Poland, which until then maintained a large degree of autonomy, had its constitution abolished and was placed under the direct rule of Russia. To maintain secure control over the lands and to suppress any future revolts that might occur here, Nicholas I assigned his prominent military engineers to design a reliable system of fortifications in this part of Europe. The endorsed project included construction of new fortifications and reconstruction of the old fortresses within 10 to 15 years.

== Construction and development ==
The project included three lines of fortresses:

- The first line, called the Defense line of the Kingdom of Poland, crossed Poland north-south, consisting of the Modlin fortress, the Warsaw Citadel, and the fortress in Ivangorod (presently Dęblin).
- The second line along the Bug River included Brest-Litovsk fortress.
- The third line was running north–south over 1,000 kilometers (620 mi) east of the first one across the present-day Latvia, Belarus and Ukraine, it consisted of the Dinaburg fortress in Dvinsk (now Daugavpils), the Babruysk fortress, and the Kyiv fortress.

The extensive size of the Russian system led to high costs of construction and maintenance, and work on the fortifications slowed in the 1840s, leading to some fortress never being completed. The importance of the forts as military garrisons declined over the following decades, with some being used as prisons or warehouses in addition to barracks.

The Franco-Prussian War from 1870 to 1871 demonstrated to the Russians the vulnerability of the fortification system when the French cities of Paris, Metz, and Sedan were taken by the Prussians despite being protected by similar system. New rifled artillery with longer range, greater accuracy, and explosive shells of greater destructive power effectively rendered the Russian fortifications obsolete.

== German threat and First World War ==
When relations between Germany and Russia deteriorated in the 1880s the fortifications saw a resurgence of importance, with the Russians modernizing some of them and adding new modern fortresses in between the old ones. In 1905, the defeat of Russia in the Russo-Japanese War caused a rethinking of military strategy, in particular the idea of concentrating forces in the interior away from the borders before hostilities began to gain popularity, eliminating the need for a chain of border fortresses.

In 1909, General Vladimir Sukhomlinov, the new War Minister for the Russian Empire, planned to demolish the western fortress system believing the forts were obsolete. Sukhomlinov's plan was overruled by a vote in the Imperial Duma, instead it was decided to strengthen and expand the system instead, and construction of the new forts was still happening at the outbreak of World War I in 1914. When Russia was invaded by Germany the following year, construction of the forts was rushed with the intention of being holdouts behind German lines, but many of the fortifications were quickly captured by German troops. The collapse of the Russian Empire in 1917 rendered the fortress system effectively useless as much of it was now located in independent countries such as the Second Polish Republic and the Baltic states.

== See also ==
- Defense line
