= Zalman Gorelik =

Belarusian geologist (1908–1987)

- Залман Абрамавич Горелик
- Born: April 5, 1908; Bobruisk, Minsk Province, Russian Empire
- Died: February 16, 1987; Minsk, Byelorussian SSR, Soviet Union
- Citizenship: USSR
- Known for: Discoverer of potash and rock salt, oil deposits in the Pripyat Trough
- Spouse: Maria Shegelman
- Scientific career
- Fields: Geology, tectonics

Zalman Abramovich Gorelik (Belarusian: Залман Абрамавіч Гарэлік; Russian: Залман Абрамавич Горелик; 5 April 1908 in Bobruisk – 16 February 1987 in Minsk) was a geologist, tectonist, and organizer of the Geological Survey of Belarus. He was also the co-discoverer of the first deposits of potash, rock salt, and oil in the Pripyat Trough. Doctor of Geological and Mineralogical Sciences (1973).
