= Babruyka =

River in Babruysk, Belarus

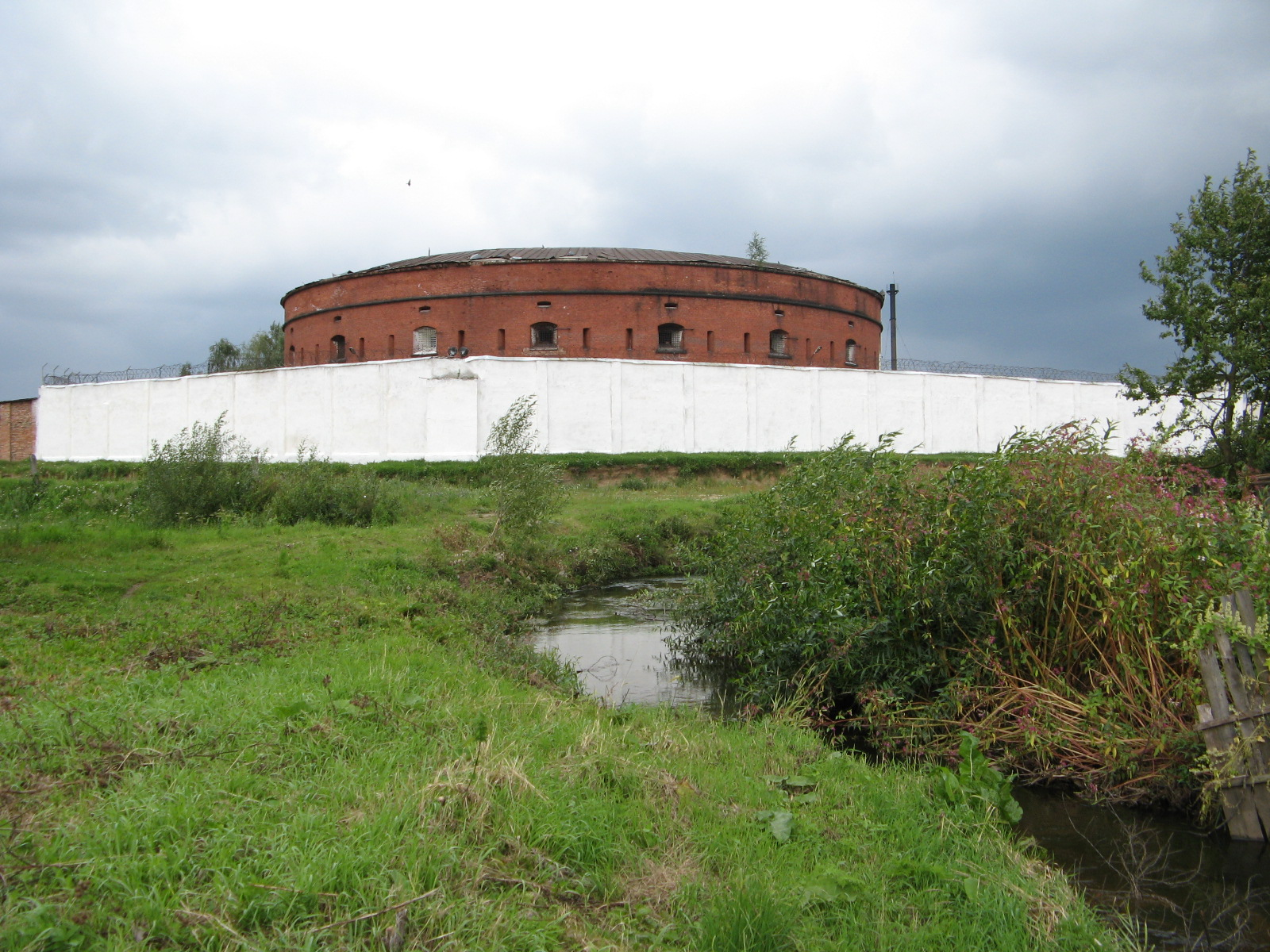
- Native name: Бабруйка (Belarusian)

Location
- Country: Belarus

Physical characteristics
- Mouth: Berezina
  - coordinates: 53.114°N 29.2608°E

Basin features
- Progression: Berezina→ Dnieper→ Dnieper–Bug estuary→ Black Sea

The Babruyka (Belarusian: Бабруйка [baˈbrujkə]) is a small river in Belarus, a tributary to the Berezina (Biarezina). It flows through the eponymous city of Babruysk and is named after the beavers which used to inhabit it. Due to industrial pollution, there are no more animals inhabiting the river, and its flow has been reduced to a fraction of its former self.

== History ==
The river got its name because it was inhabited by a large number of eurasian beavers.
