= Lev Gorelik =

Russian footballer

Lev Gorelik Лев Горелик
Personal information
- Full name: Lev Grigoryevich Gorelik
- Date of birth: 28 January 1992 (age 34)
- Place of birth: Russia
- Height: 1.87 m (6 ft 1 1/2 in)
- Position: Goalkeeper

Youth career
- Zenit Saint Petersburg

Senior career*
| Years | Team | Apps | (Gls) |
| 2012–2013 | Karelia Petrozavodsk | 8 | (0) |
| 2013–2014 | Pskov-747 Pskov | 4 | (0) |
| 2015–2018 | TSK Simferopol | 4 | (0) |
| 2018 | Maccabi Herzliya | 10 | (0) |
| 2018–2019 | Maccabi Ironi Sderot | 35 | (0) |
| 2019 | Maccabi Ironi Kiryat Ata | 4 | (0) |
| 2019–2020 | Maccabi Ironi Sderot | 12 | (0) |
| 2021 | Maccabi Tamra | 5 | (0) |
| 2021 | Maccabi Ironi Tirat HaCarmel | 7 | (0) |
| 2021–2022 | Hapoel Iksal | 9 | (0) |
| 2022 | Maccabi Ironi Sderot | 0 | (0) |
- * Club domestic league appearances and goals

Lev Grigoryevich Gorelik (Russian: Лев Григорьевич Горелик; born 28 January 1992) is a Russian former footballer who played as a goalkeeper.

== Club career ==
He made his debut in the Russian Second Division for FC Karelia Petrozavodsk on 17 August 2012 in a game against FC Lokomotiv-2 Moscow.
