= 40th Infantry Division (Russian Empire) =

- 40-я пехотная дивизия
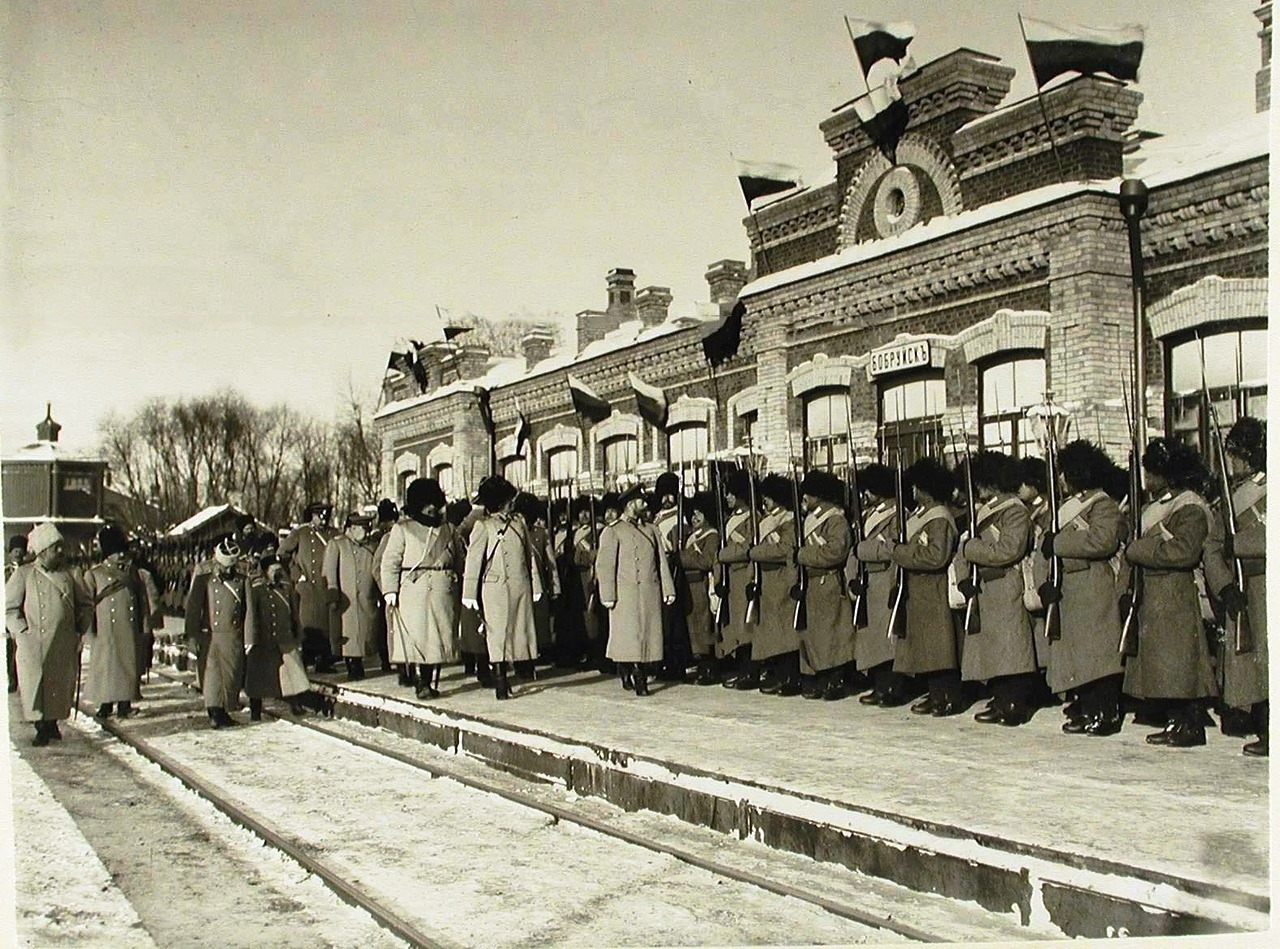
- Nicholas II of Russia reviewing soldiers of the 1st Brigade at Babruysk Station, 21 December 1904
- Active: 1914–1918
- Country: Russian Empire
- Branch: Russian Imperial Army
- Role: Infantry

The 40th Infantry Division (Russian: 40-я пехо́тная диви́зия, 40-ya Pekhotnaya Diviziya) was an infantry formation of the Russian Imperial Army.

During the First World War on 13 July 1915 the 40th Infantry Division, alongside the 50th Infantry Division successfully defended the Pultusk bridgehead from German forces attempting to cross the river Narew at Pułtusk.

== Organization ==
- 1st Brigade
  - 157th Imeretinsky Infantry Regiment (formed 11/6/1863)
  - 158th Kutaisi Infantry Regiment (formed 11/6/1863)

The 1st Brigade participated in the Battle of Kars. From 1892 the 1st Brigade was based at the Babruysk fortress, Belarus.

- 2nd Brigade
  - 159th Infantry Regiment
  - 160th Infantry Regiment
- 40th Artillery Brigade
