= Libava–Romny Railway =

Railway in Russian Empire

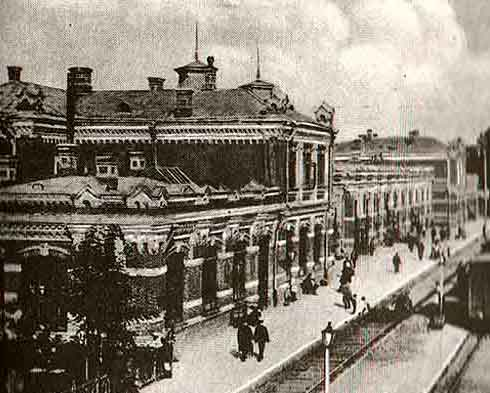
The station of Libav–Romny Railway in Minsk

Railway in current Lithuanian rail system

Libava–Romny Railway (Russian: Либаво-Роменская железная дорога) (Note: It was also known as Libau–Romny Railway, after the German name of Liepāja; also as the Liepāja–Romny Railway) was a railway company that built a railway line in the Russian Empire in 1871–74 to connect Romny in Ukraine with the port in Liepāja, then named Libava in the Russian Empire, in present-day Latvia. To do so it passed through Minsk. The objective of the railway was to deliver Ukrainian exports, particularly grain, to the Baltic Sea where it could be further shipped.

== History ==
In 1856 a concession to build the railway was granted to the main Russian railway company (Главное общество российских железных дорог), but it failed to gather the required authorised capital. Afterwards the concession was granted to the Libava-Romny railway company which was founded by businessmen who were interested in exporting Ukrainian grain. The company was headed by engineer baron Karl Otto Georg von Meck. Design works started in 1869. On 15 December 1871 the state finished and approved the design, the new railway line was supposed to cross the Courland, Kaunas, Vilnius, Minsk, Mogilev and Chernihiv governorates. The railway was built in sections:

- Liepāja/Libava–Kaišiadorys (295 versts) Operation began in September 1871;
- Naujoji Vilnia–Minsk (173 versts) began on 14 (26 New Style) January 1873;
- Minsk–Bobruisk (140 versts) began in September 1873;
- Bobruisk–Gomel (142 versts) began in November 1873;
- Gomel–Bakhmach (184 versts) began in January 1874
- Bakhmach–Romny began on 15 (27) July 1874.

After Meck's death in 1876 his second son, Vladimir von Meck, was chairman of the Libava–Romny Railway until 1881

A branch from Radviliškis to Daugavpils (completed in 1873) and station in Naujoji Vilnia connected the railway to the Saint Petersburg–Warsaw Railway. The station in Mažeikiai connected Libava–Romny line to the Riga–Jelgava Railway; the station in Minsk connected the line to the Moscow–Brest Railway; the station in Bakhmach connected the line to Kiev–Voronezh Railway; the station in Romny connected the line to the Kharkiv–Mykolaiv Railway. Railway stations were built every 22 versts without regard to geographic or other conditions.

The railway lay at right angles to the German axes of advance in both world wars. In the First World War the portion west of Smorgon (now Smarhon') fell into German hands in the great Austro-German advance of May–September 1915, the rest following the Treaty of Brest-Litovsk in March 1918. It remained in German hands until the Armistice of 11 November 1918, and upon German evacuation was nationalized as part of the Western Railways.

In the Second World War the line fell into German hands between 22 June and late September 1941. The Gomel-Bakhmach-Romny portion was recovered by Soviet forces in September–December 1943; the remainder was recovered from German hands in June–August 1944 and January–May 1945.

Today the railway is located in four countries, Latvia, Lithuania, Belarus and Ukraine. Operation of the portion between the Baltic Sea and Mažeikiai was discontinued in 1990.
