= Siege of Varna (1828) =

1828 battle of the Russo-Turkish War (1828–1829)

- Part of the Russo-Turkish War, 1828–1829
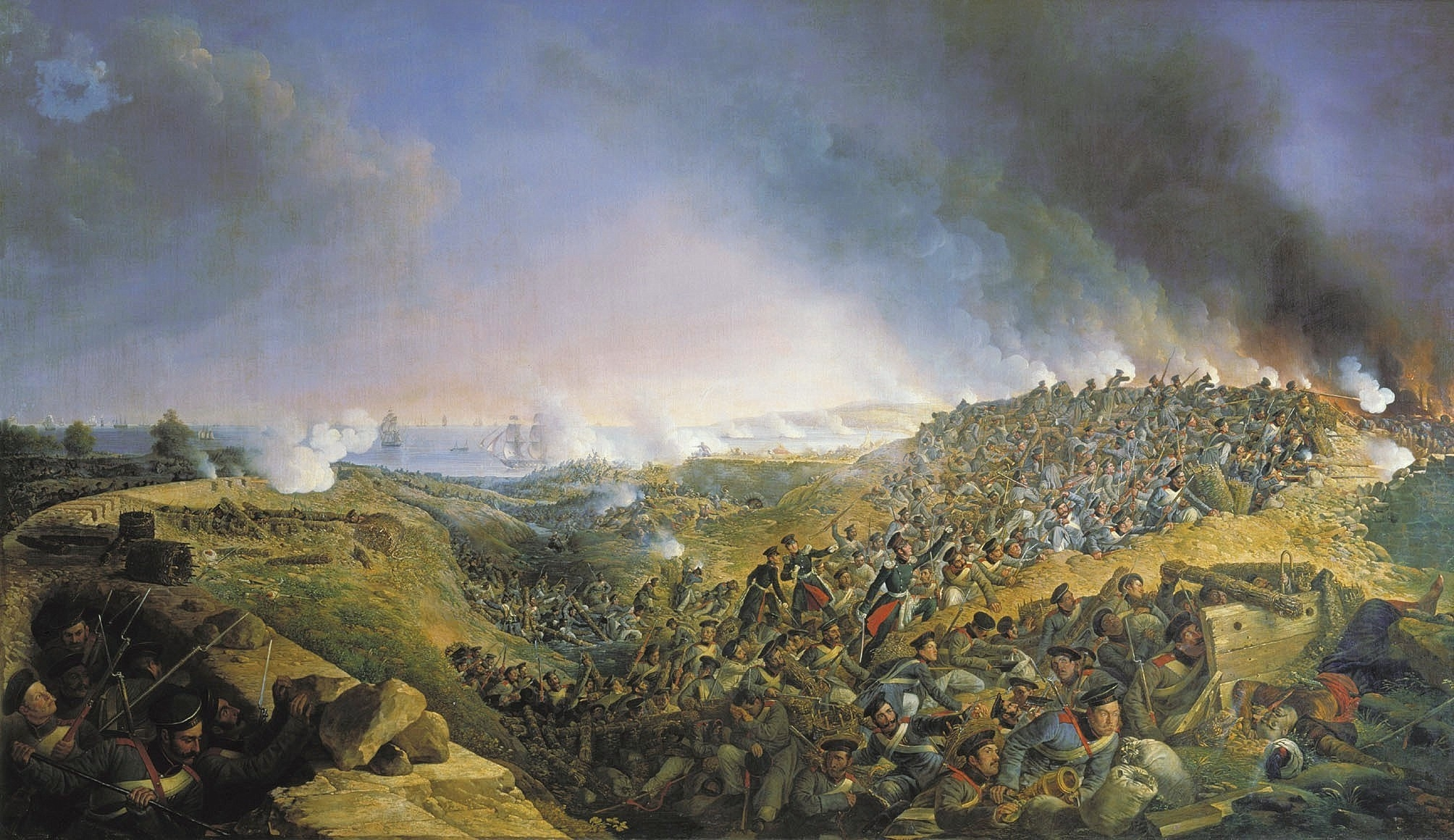
- Painting by Alexander Sauerweid (1836)
Date	13 July – 29 September 1828
Location	Varna, Ottoman Bulgaria 43°12′28″N 27°55′01″E
Result	Russian victory

Belligerents
Russian Empire; Imperial Russian Navy	Ottoman Empire

Commanders and leaders
(Russian Empire) Pavel Suchtelen (Russian Empire) Pavel Ushakov (Russian Empire) Alexander Menshikov (WIA); Nicholas I (Russian Empire) Vasily Perovsky (Russian Empire) Mikhail Vorontsov (Russian Empire) Eugen of Württemberg (Russian Empire) Karl Bistram (Russian Empire) Ivan Trousson (Russian Empire) Aleksey Greig (Russian Empire) Faddey Bellingshausen	(Ottoman Empire) Yusuf Pasha (Ottoman Empire) Omer Vrioni

Strength
40,519 men, 118 cannons 8 ships of the line, 5 frigates, 13 small vessels, 52 naval cannons	Garrison: 12,000; Omer Vrioni: >20,000

Casualties and losses
3,290 dead and wounded	Unknown number of dead/wounded/missing 10,887 captured
- Location within Bulgaria Siege of Varna (1828) (Black Sea)

The siege of Varna (13 July – 29 September 1828) took place during the Russo-Turkish War, 1828–1829. The Russian troops forced the Turkish garrison of Varna to capitulate after more than two-month siege.

== History ==
Varna was held by the Ottoman army. An approach to Varna by Russian forces was first attempted on 28 June, but the Russian advance guard under Adjutant General Count Pavel Petrovich Suchtelen was met by significant Turkish forces, and the siege was postponed. On 6 July the detachment of General Pavel Nikolayevich Ushakov arrived, which was to replace Suchtelen's detachment. Ushakov strengthened the position of encirclement and repelled a sortie and attack near the village of Gebeji on 8 July. Fearing exhaustion of the forces from sorties, Ushakov took his detachment back to Dervent-Kioy, covering communications with Shumla and watching the road to Kavarna, where he remained until 19 July, when the detachment was reinforced by 2 brigades that arrived from Anapa.

By the end of July, the Black Sea Fleet under the command of Admiral Aleksey Samuilovich Greig approached Varna and delivered the landing forces. In mid-August the Guards Corps arrived at Varna, with Emperor Nicholas I. The siege was put under the command of Adjutant General Prince Alexander Sergeyevich Menshikov, with total forces of 23,000 personnel and 170 artillery pieces against the 12,000 garrison of Varna under Vizier Yusuf Pasha. When Menshikov was wounded with a cannonball to both feet (8 Aug.), the siege was entrusted to General Field Marshal Count Mikhail Semyonovich Vorontsov (he arrived on 17 August), but before that, command was temporarily transferred to Major General Vasily Alekseevich Perovsky when the Turks, who were receiving continuous support from the southern side (4,000 reinforcements in total), which was poorly observed, made a large sortie, striking, in particular, at the 13th and 14th Jaeger Regiments; the attack was repelled with cold arms. On 21 August the Turks were driven out of counter-laufgraben by a bayonet strike.

In the meantime, Greig's fleet actively assisted the siege by bombardment, landing, blockade of the territory from the sea and supplying it with large artillery. Among the participants of naval siege was the future discoverer of Antarctica, Fabian von Bellingshausen (Faddey Bellingshausen).

In an attempt to relieve the siege of Varna, Omer Vrioni brought an army of 20,000 but was successfully held off. At the Battle of Kurttepe the Russians under Prince Eugen of Württemberg attacked but they were defeated and retreated, despite the defensive success of General Karl Ivanovich Bistram's troops, who had repulsed both the garrison and Omer Vrioni's army. However, the Turks did not follow up this victory and waited 11 days at the place. On 1 September the central redoubt was stormed and a counter-laufgraben were cleared with bayonets. Siege works were now carried out by order of General Trousson 2nd; on 31 August the attackers had set up trench on the crest of glacis, and on 2 September the saps with 300 pounds of powder were blown up and a convenient descent into the ditch was formed. The proposal to surrender the fortress was rejected, and by order of Nicholas proceeded to the close attack and preparation of the assault on the bastions. On 4 September the siege artillery arrived, due to which the Turkish artillery fire was suppressed, and the attack moved forward quickly. Colonel Schilder had to use a special method to cross the ditch of the second bastion. From the mine gallery in the counterscarp he made an opening into the moat, thrown away the Turks from the moat by rifle fire, and went forward along a sap made of plank shields, with overhead fascines covering them. The moat was thrown with water fascines and a roofed sap made of cairns and covered with fascines. In this way they reached the scarp and, in spite of the desperate garrison's sorties and the destruction of that works, laid mines. Eventually, Varna capitulated.

Varna was taken with 6,900 prisoners and 140 artillery pieces. The town was surrendered by Yusuf Pasha.

However, the Russians suffered big losses during the summer-autumn campaign and withdrew from Varna and the Danube to resume the campaign in the following spring. The Russians had lost 6,000 men in the siege from battles and disease.
