= Battle of Kurttepe =

- Part of Russo-Turkish War (1828–1829)
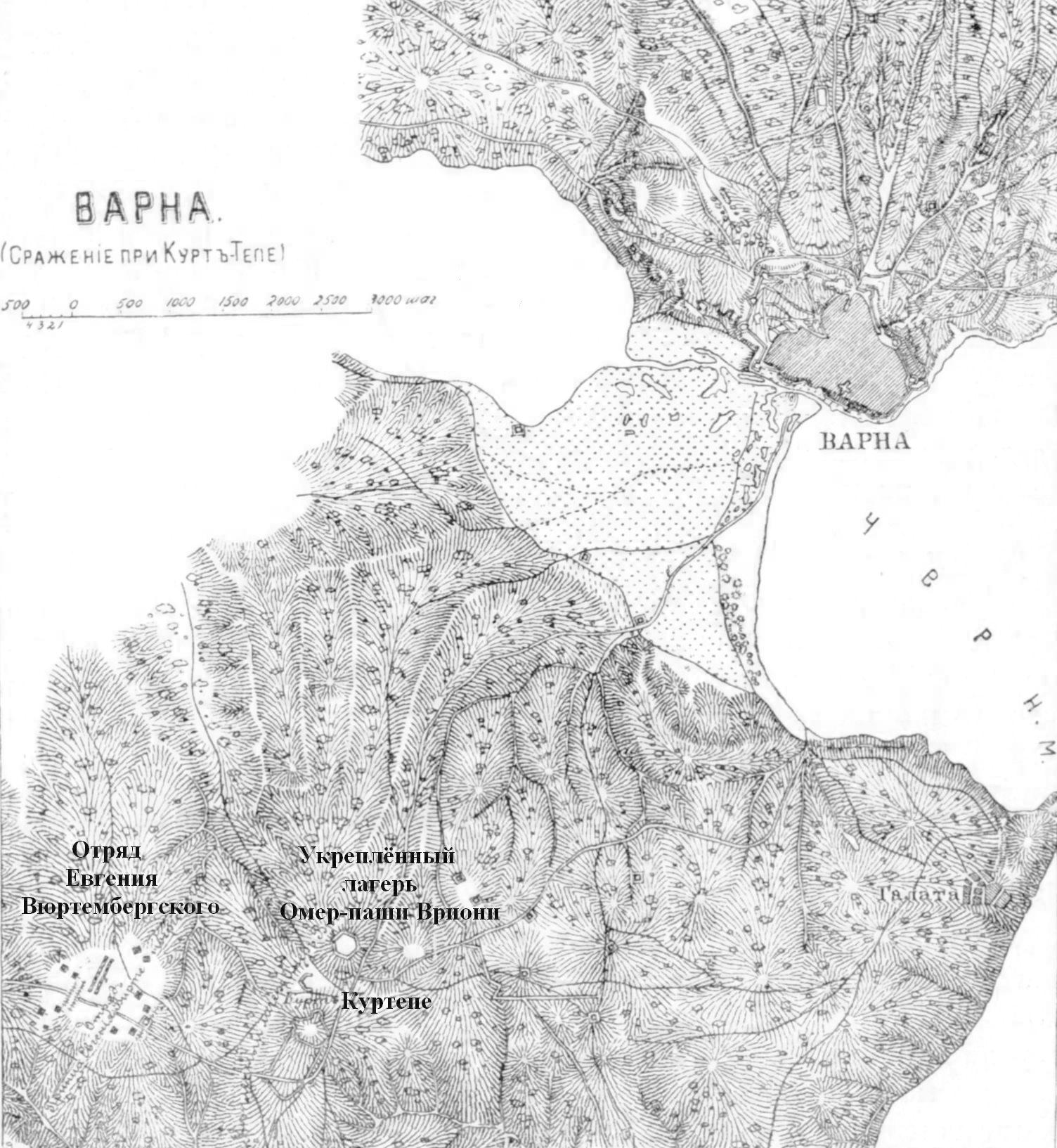
- The area of the Battle of Kurttepe during the Siege of Varna
Date	30 September 1828
Location	Kurttepe, Varna, Ottoman Empire
Result	Ottoman victory

Belligerents
Ottoman Empire	(Russia) Russian Empire

Commanders and leaders
(Ottoman Empire) Omer Vrioni	(Russia) Prince Eugen of Württemberg (Russia) General Karl von Bistram (Russia) General Nikolay Durnovo † (Russia) General Nikolai Sukhozanet

Strength
26,000 soldiers, 16 guns	17,000 soldiers, 64 guns

Casualties and losses
light	~2,000 killed or wounded

The Battle of Kurttepe was a part of the Russo-Turkish War (1828–1829).

The Ottoman army under Omer Vrioni defeated the Russian forces commanded by Eugen of Württemberg near Varna on 30 September 1828.

== Background ==
During the Russo-Turkish War (1828–1829), while the Russians were besieging Varna, they learned that Omer Vrioni was advancing toward Varna following his victory at the Battle of Hacıhasanlar. The Russians reinforced the forces near Galata Burnu under General Yevgeny Golovin while continuing the siege. General Karl von Bistram was appointed commander of all Russian troops south of Varna. General Golovin had 2,500 soldiers and 12 guns, and the other group had 6,500 soldiers and 18 guns. Additionally, a Russian unit under Prince Eugen near Yenipazar aimed to cut off Viryoni’s connections. Some of these units forced the Turkish forces stationed at Hacıhasanlar on 27 September to withdraw to Kurttepe. The Russians intended to encircle the Ottoman army with the units under Prince Württemberg and General Bistram.

== Battle ==
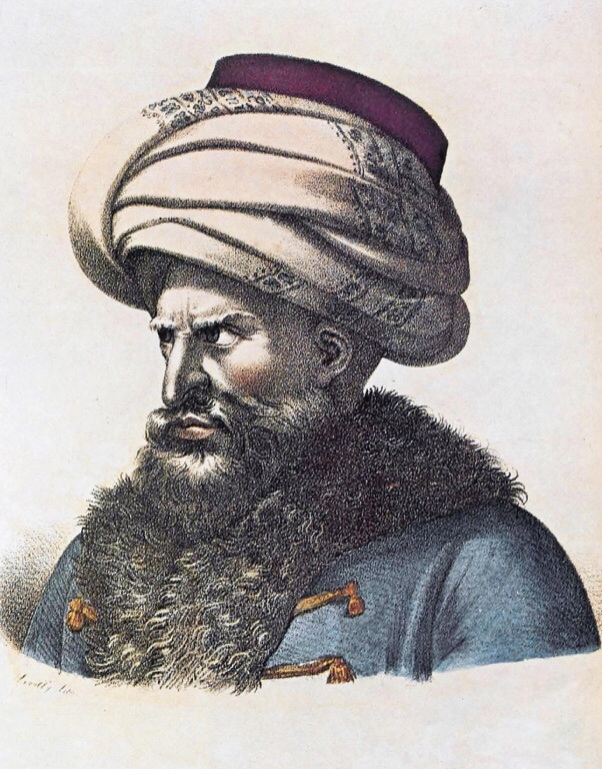
Omer Vrioni

While General Bistram prepared an assault, Omer Vrioni launched an attack on 28 September 1828 with 15,000 troops. Simultaneously, the Ottoman garrison of Varna launched a sortie against General Golovin's forces, inflicting casualties. Finnish regiments counterattacked, stabilizing the front.

On the same day, a Russian unit under General Nikolai Sukhozanet conducted reconnaissance from Hacıhasanlar and mistakenly reported that the Ottoman force at Kurttepe consisted of only 8,000 troops, recommending a double-flank assault. Prince Württemberg planned to attack at 14:00 on 29 September but postponed when realizing the Ottoman force was around 26,000. Tsar Nicholas I ordered the reinforcements not to move until the Ottoman army near Varna was engaged.

On 30 September at 10:00, 11,000 Russian troops attacked and captured a redoubt 1 km west of Kurttepe, followed by an artillery bombardment with 10 guns. Ottoman counterattacks halted several Russian advances.

Prince Württemberg continued the assault with General Nikolay Durnovo’s Azov regiment. Despite initial Ottoman retreat, reinforcements under General Simanski, including the Dnieper regiment and a Ukrainian battalion, suffered heavy losses. Five Russian battalions near the forest were threatened with destruction and retreated. Prince Württemberg withdrew to Hacıhasanlar, with 1,400 Russian casualties. General Bistram’s forces lost over 500 men, and General Durnovo was killed.

== Aftermath ==
Following the engagements around Kurttepe, the Russian forces abandoned the positions they had previously captured and withdrew northward. Despite this development, Ömer Pasha did not exploit the situation and remained in the area without undertaking further offensive action. The Russians did not launch another attack against Ömer Pasha’s forces.
