= Märjamaa Landscape Conservation Area =

Protected area in Estonia

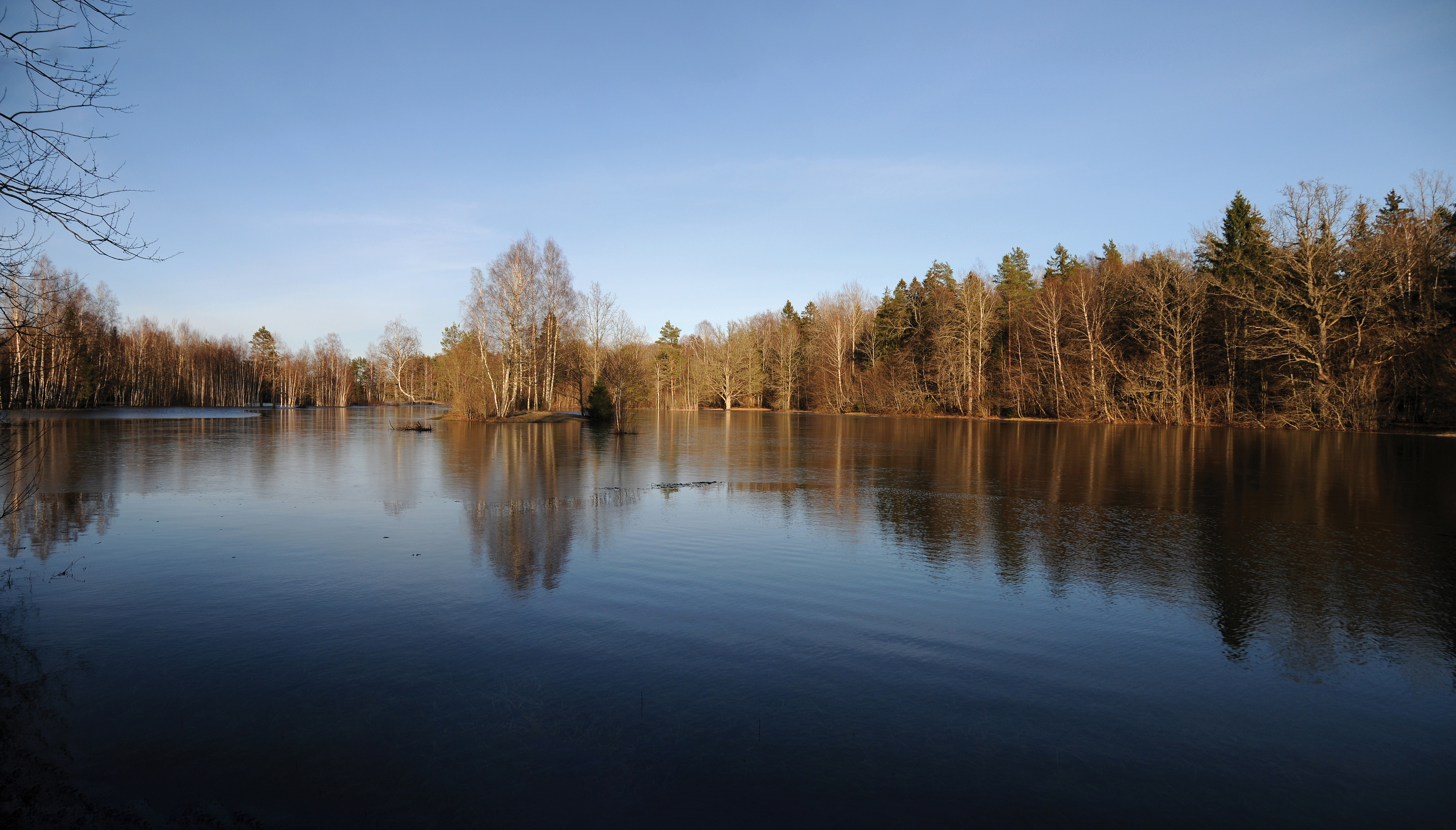

- Location within Estonia
- Location: Estonia
- Coordinates: 58°54′N 24°27′E
- Area: 106 ha (260 acres)
- Established: 1981 (2006)

Märjamaa Landscape Conservation Area is a nature park which is located in Rapla County, Estonia.

The area of the nature park is 106 ha.

The protected area was founded in 1981 to protect Märjamaa karst formations (Estonian: Märjamaa järtad). In 2006, the protected area was designated to the landscape conservation area.
