= Vasily Andreyevich Dolgorukov =

Vasily Dolgorukov
- Василий Долгоруков
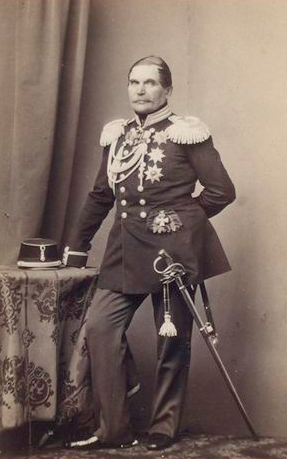
- Dolgorukov in 1865

Minister of War of the Russian Empire
- In office 26 August 1852 – 17 April 1856
- Preceded by: Alexander Chernyshyov
- Succeeded by: Nikolay Sukhozanet

Personal details
- Born: March 2, 1804 Moscow, Russian Empire
- Died: January 17, 1868 (aged 63) Saint Petersburg, Russian Empire
- Resting place: Lazarevskoe Cemetery
- Occupation: Militar officer, politician

Military service
- Battles/wars: Crimean War

Prince Vasily Andreyevich Dolgorukov (Russian: Князь Василий Андреевич Долгоруков; 1804–1868) was a Russian statesman, General of the Cavalry (1856, a full General equivalent), Minister of War (1852–1856), Chief of Gendarmes and Executive Head of the Third Section of H.I.M. Chancellery (1856–1866).

== Biography ==
From the Dolgorukov family. He was born in Moscow into the family of state councilor Prince Andrei Nikolaevich Dolgorukov (1772-1834) and Elizaveta Nikolaevna Saltykova. He was baptized on February 24, 1804 in the Church of the Life-Giving Trinity in Zubovo at the reception of his grandfather N. N. Saltykov.

His father was the grandnephew of Field Marshal Vasily Vladimirovich Dolgorukov, his mother was the granddaughter of Chief Prosecutor Yakov Shakhovskoy. He had brothers Nikolai, Ivan (1796-1807), Ilya, Sergei (1802-1832), Dmitry (1808-1809), Vladimir and sisters Ekaterina, Maria, Alexandra. Having received his education at home, in 1821 he entered the Life Guards as a cadet. Cavalry Regiment and was promoted to cornet on February 23, 1823.

While serving on the inner guard of the Winter Palace on December 14, 1825, during the Decembrist revolt, he attracted the attention of Emperor Nicholas I. Walking to the square, the Emperor asked if he could count on him. "Your Majesty! I am Prince Dolgorukov!" the young cornet answered. On September 5, 1830, Dolgorukov, with the rank of staff captain of the Cavalry Regiment, was appointed aide-de-camp and the following year took part in the suppression of the Polish rebellion and received the Order of St. Vladimir, 4th degree, St. Anne, 2nd degree, and the rank of captain

Promoted to colonel in 1835, Dolgorukov accompanied Alexander Nikolaevich on his journey through Europe and Russia from 1838 to 1841. In 1841 he was appointed acting chief of staff of the inspector of reserve cavalry, who was in charge of 3 corps and southern military settlements. On September 22, 1842, he was promoted to major general with an appointment to the retinue and confirmation in the position, and three years later he was granted the title of adjutant general.

In 1848, Dolgorukov was appointed to the post of Deputy Minister of War and the following year promoted to lieutenant general and appointed a member of the Military Council. In 1851 and 1852, following the departure of the Minister of War Prince Alexander Chernyshyov abroad, he managed the ministry for several months, and on August 26, 1852, he finally took up this responsible post. The Eastern War that soon broke out required extraordinary effort from Dolgorukov and was a difficult test for him. Accused of the failure of the Russian military machine, he was nevertheless awarded the Order of St. Andrew the First-Called and St. Vladimir, 1st degree, by the Emperor.

At the end of the Crimean War, radical changes were planned in the army, and Dolgorukov, not feeling the strength to implement them, asked to be dismissed from the post of Minister of War. On April 17, 1856, his request was fulfilled, and Dolgorukov was appointed a member of the State Council with promotion to general of cavalry. Three months later, at the personal request of the sovereign, Dolgorukov took the post of chief of the Corps of Gendarmes and head of the 3rd section of His Imperial Majesty's Own Chancellery.

== Honours and awards ==
- Order of Saint Vladimir, 1st and 4th classes
- Order of Saint Anna, 2nd class
- Order of St. Andrew

Preceded by Alexander Chernyshyov	Minister of War; 1852 – 1856	Succeeded by Nikolay Sukhozanet
