= Battle of Hacıhasanlar =

1828 battle during the Russo-Turkish War

- Part of the Russo-Turkish War (1828–1829)
Date	24 September 1828
Location	Hacıhasanlar, Varna, Ottoman Empire
Result	Ottoman victory

Belligerents
Ottoman Empire	Russian Empire

Commanders and leaders
Omer Vrioni	(Russian Empire) General Harding † (Russian Empire) Colonel Jalovski

Strength
15,000 soldiers	1,500 soldiers 2 cannons

Casualties and losses
Light	500 killed 150 wounded

The battle of Hacıhasanlar was a phase of the Russo-Turkish War (1828–1829). On 24 September 1828, the Ottoman corps under the command of Omer Vrioni inflicted a major defeat at Hacıhasanlar near Varna on the Russian army's reconnaissance corps under General Harding, who was besieging Varna.

== Prelude ==
During the Russo-Turkish War (1828–1829), whilst the siege of Varna conducted by the Russian army was in progress, General Golovin withdrew his forces to Cape Galata and began a reconnaissance mission to gather information about the Ottoman forces, but failed to find any satisfactory information. Meanwhile, Omer Vrioni, who had been sent from Shumnu to Varna as a relief forve on 22 September 1828, arrived at Hacıhasanlar on 24 September with a force of 15,000 men, where he took up a defensive formation.

== Battle ==
The 500-strong Russian army consisting of 1 fighter regiment, 3 cavalry divisions and 2 cannons, encountered Omer Vrioni's corps near the village of Hacıhasanlar. A skirmish started with mutual rifle fire. Simultaneously, part of the Turkish corps moved to surround the right (eastern) flank of the Russian column. Seeing this, General Harding ordered 5.5 companies of 700 skirmishers to act as rearguard, while 2.5 companies of skirmishers retreated with cavalry and artillery under Colonel Jalovski. However, Colonel Jalovski did not mark the roads as he retreated, so the rearguard lost contact with the retreating force. The Turkish corps forced this rearguard into close combat, pinning it down and almost destroying it. Among the dead was its commander, General Harding.

== Aftermath ==
The Ottoman 2nd Army, under the command of Grand Vizier Mehmed Selim Pasha was massed around Aydos at this time. The Grand Vizier sent part of these forces to reinforce Omer Vrioni's army after his victory at Hacıhasanlar. Thus, the forces under the command of Omer Pasha reached 20,000–25.000 men and the number of cannons reached 16. With these forces, Omer Pasha arrived at Kurttepe, 5 kilometers south of Varna and took up a defensive formation on 26 September. On 30 September, the Battle of Kurttepe took place between this Ottoman army under the command of Omer Vrioni and the Russian army under the command of Prince Württemberg; the battle once more ended in an Ottoman victory.
