= Ushakov =

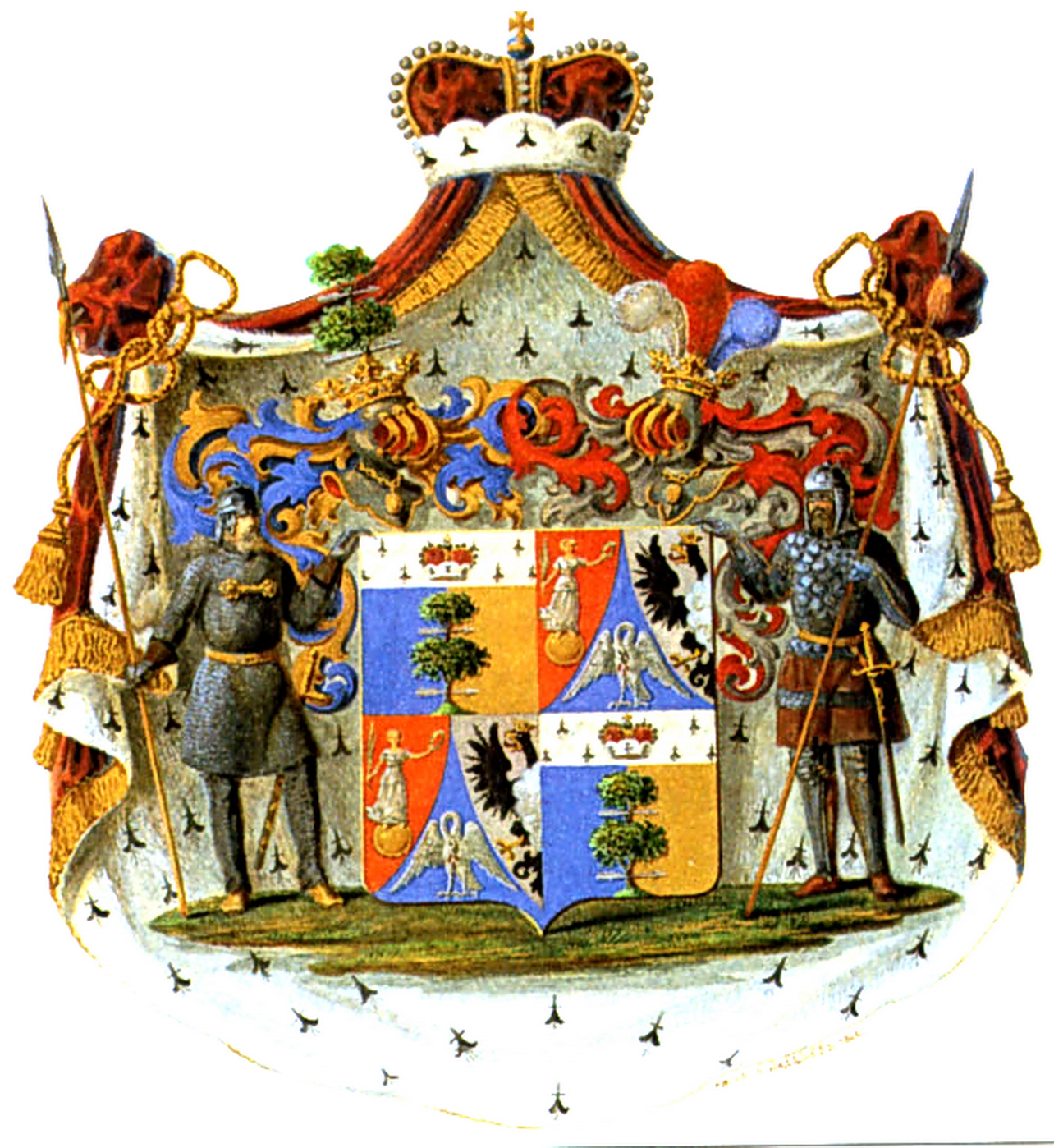
Coat of arms of Ushakov family

The House of Ushakov is the name of an old and influential Russian noble family, whose members occupied many important positions within the Russian Empire.

Notable people with the surname Ushakov or Ushakova (feminine form) include:

- Andrei Ushakov (1762-1747), Russian military commander and state official
- Arina Ushakova (ice dancer) (born 2002)
- Arina Ushakova (pair skater) (born 1989)
- Bogolep of Chorny Yar (1647-1654) was a Russian Orthodox child schema-monk, a locally venerated saint of the Russian Orthodox Church
- Dmitry Ushakov (1873–1942), Russian philologist
- Fyodor Ushakov (1745–1817), Russian admiral
- Georgy Ushakov (1901–1963), Soviet Arctic explorer
- Irina Ushakova
- Konstantin Ushakov (b. 1970), Russian volleyball player
- Nils Ušakovs (b. 1976), Latvian journalist and politician, former mayor of Riga
- Pavel Ushakov (1779–1853), Russian general
- Simon Ushakov (1626–1686), Russian icon painter
- Yuri Ushakov (b. 1947), Russian diplomat
- Zinovy Ushakov (1895–1940), Soviet police officer
