= RFC Märjamaa =

Estonian rugby club

- Nickname(s): Vikat (Scythes)
- Founded: 2009
- Location: Märjamaa, Estonia
- President: Rainer Koppel
Team kit

RFC Märjamaa is an Estonian rugby club based in the borough of Märjamaa.

== History ==
The club was founded in 2009.
