= Adam Otto von Bistram =

Russian commander (1774–1828)

- Адам Иванович Бистром
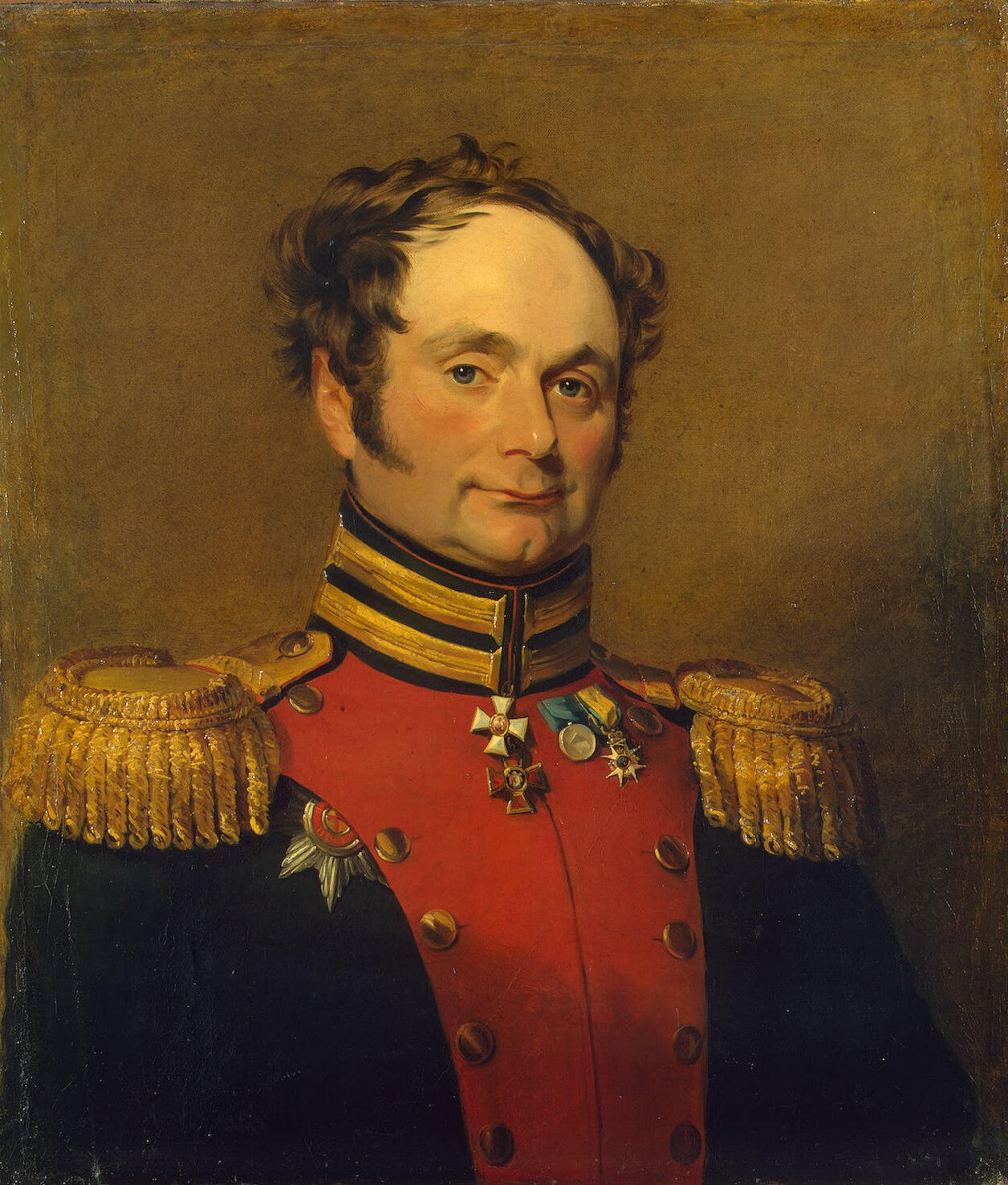
- Portrait by George Dawe, 1819–1825
- Born: October 23, 1774; Merjama, Russian Empire
- Died: October 17, 1828 (aged 53); Dresden
- Relatives: Karl von Bistram (brother)
- Military career
- Allegiance: Russia
- Branch: Imperial Russian Army
- Rank: Generalleutnant
- Conflicts: Napoleonic Wars

Adam Otto Wilhelm Freiherr von Bistram, also known as Adam Ivanovich Bistrom (Russian: Адам Иванович Бистром; 23 October 1774 – 17 October 1828), was a commander in the Imperial Russian Army during the Napoleonic Wars. He was from a Baltic German noble family and his elder brother Karl von Bistram also fought in these wars.
