= Life Guards Jager Regiment (Russia) =

Lifeguard Jaeger Regiment — III —
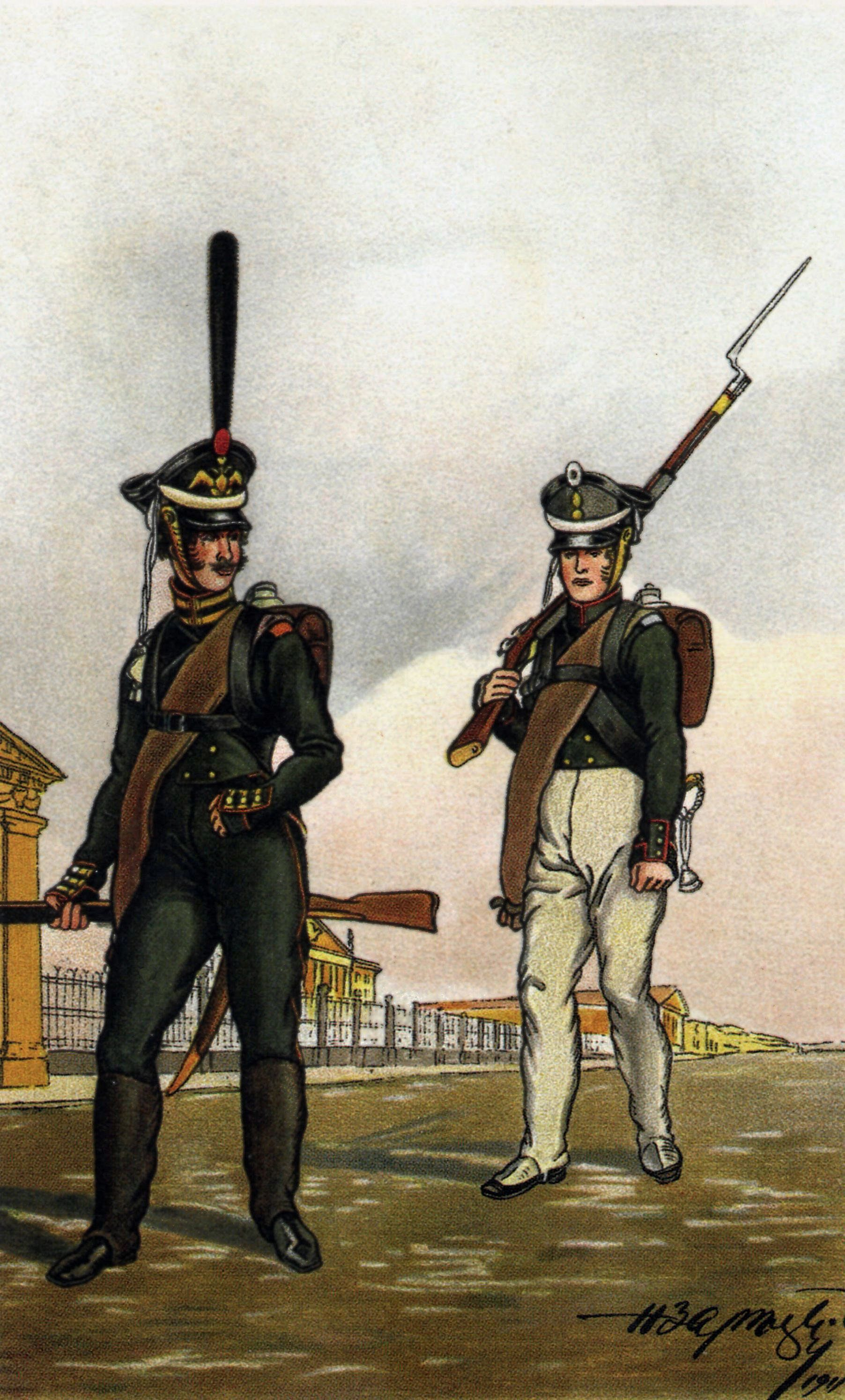
- A carabinier of the Life Guards Jäger Regiment (winter dress; on the left) and a jäger of the 14th Jäger Regiment (summer dress), 1812
- Active: 1796–1917
- Country: Russian Empire
- Branch: Russian Imperial Guard
- Type: Infantry
- Size: Regiment
- Garrison/HQ: St. Petersburg (1914)

Insignia
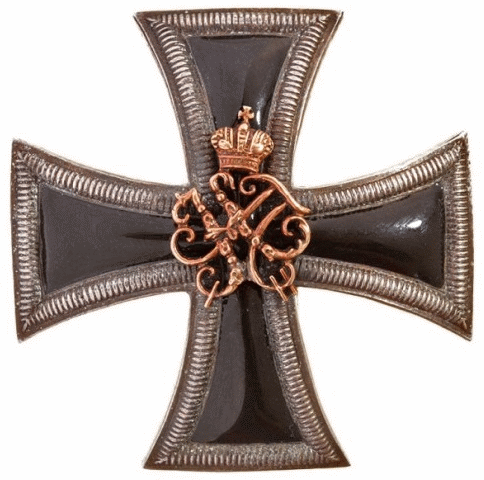
- Badge of the regiment

His Majesty Lifeguard Jaeger Regiment (Russian: «Лейб-гвардии Егерский Его Величества полк»), also called Lifeguard Jaeger Regiment (or LG Jaeger Regiment), was a Jäger regiment of the Russian Imperial Guard from 1796 to 1917.

== History ==
The history of the LG Jaeger Regiment began in 1792 with the introduction of a new branch of service – the light infantry – under the leadership of Paul I of Russia. This new service branch was named Jaeger (ru: Егер in reference to the German noun Jäger). The role of the new corps matched those of the rifle regiments of the contemporary British Army and the chasseurs of the French Army.

The first step taken was to identify suitable recruits from among the so-called Gattchino troops (ru: Гатчинские войска / Gatchinskie voyska) in Gatchina and Pavlovsk, and to concentrate these men in separate Jaeger companies under the command of Major Anton Rachinski. At the end of 1793 there was further restructuring, followed by the formal establishment of the new regiment in 1794. The adoption of light to medium green facings for the jaeger, using green camisol, was an innovation in the Russian Army.

By All Highest Order (i.e. from the tsar) dated November 20, 1796; all units of the Gattchino troops received the status of "Old Guard" (ru: старая гвардия). The hitherto separate Jaeger companies were further concentrated into a jaeger battalion, strengthened by a third Jaeger company. The already existing guard regiments: the Semjonov LG Regiment and the Ismailov LG Regiment, as well as the new LG Jaeger Battalion were all put under a common command. November 20, 1796 was henceforth to be celebrated each year as being the official date of the regiment's foundation. Anton Rachinski, now promoted to podpolkovnik, became the first commanding officer of the LG Jaeger Battalion. In 1800, Prince Bagration, Pyotr Ivanovich, replaced him. In order to strengthen the battalion, a third Jaeger company was added. During the Battle of Austerlitz, the new Jaeger Corps received their baptism of fire and performed with distinction.

On May 22, 1806 the personnel strength of the battalion was doubled. This expansion led to the unit being renamed as LG Jaeger Regiment. A third battalion was recruited, in order to provide a further strengthening of the new regiment. In 1809 Polkovnik Karl von Bistram became the new commander. After suffering heavy losses during the Russo-Turkish War (1877–1878) in fighting close to Varna on September 10, 1878, the second battalion had to be re-established. To provide the numbers needed detachments of the 13th and 14th Jager Regiments were transferred to the LG Jaeger Regiment.

During a holy memorial service on the battle area to Kulm in 1835, Nicholas I of Russia in person was evaluating the extraordinary merits of the LG Jager Regiment. In this connection the day of the Saint and martyr Miron, August 17, was selected to holyday or "great day of the regiment". From this point in time Miron became the patron saint of the regiment, and in 1854 the regiment's church received his name. In 1855 the regiment was renamed to Lifeguard Gatchinski Regiment. However, this decision was cancelled on the occasion of the great day of the regiment in 1870.

== Regiment barracks ==
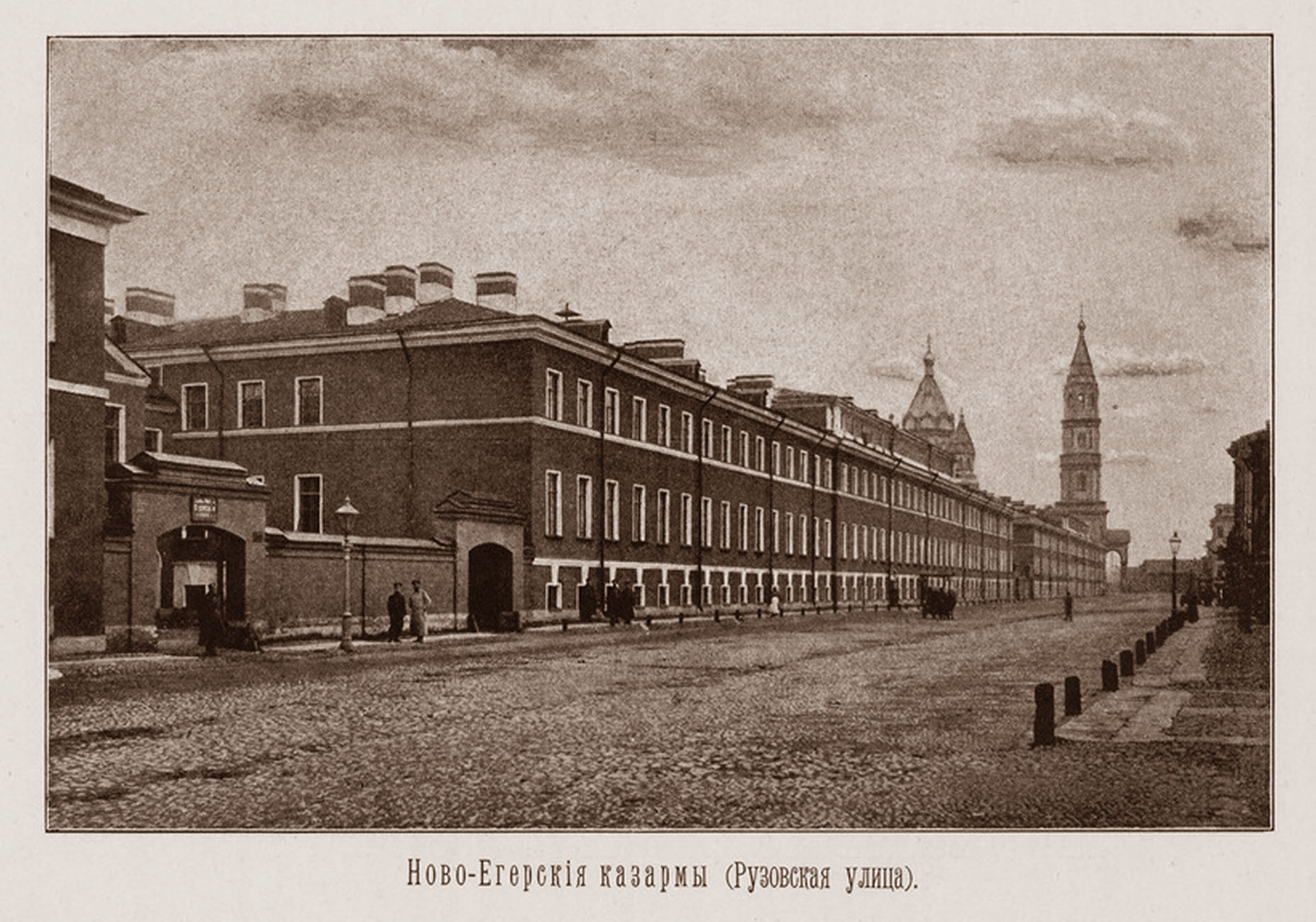
Regimental barracks in St Petersburg 1896

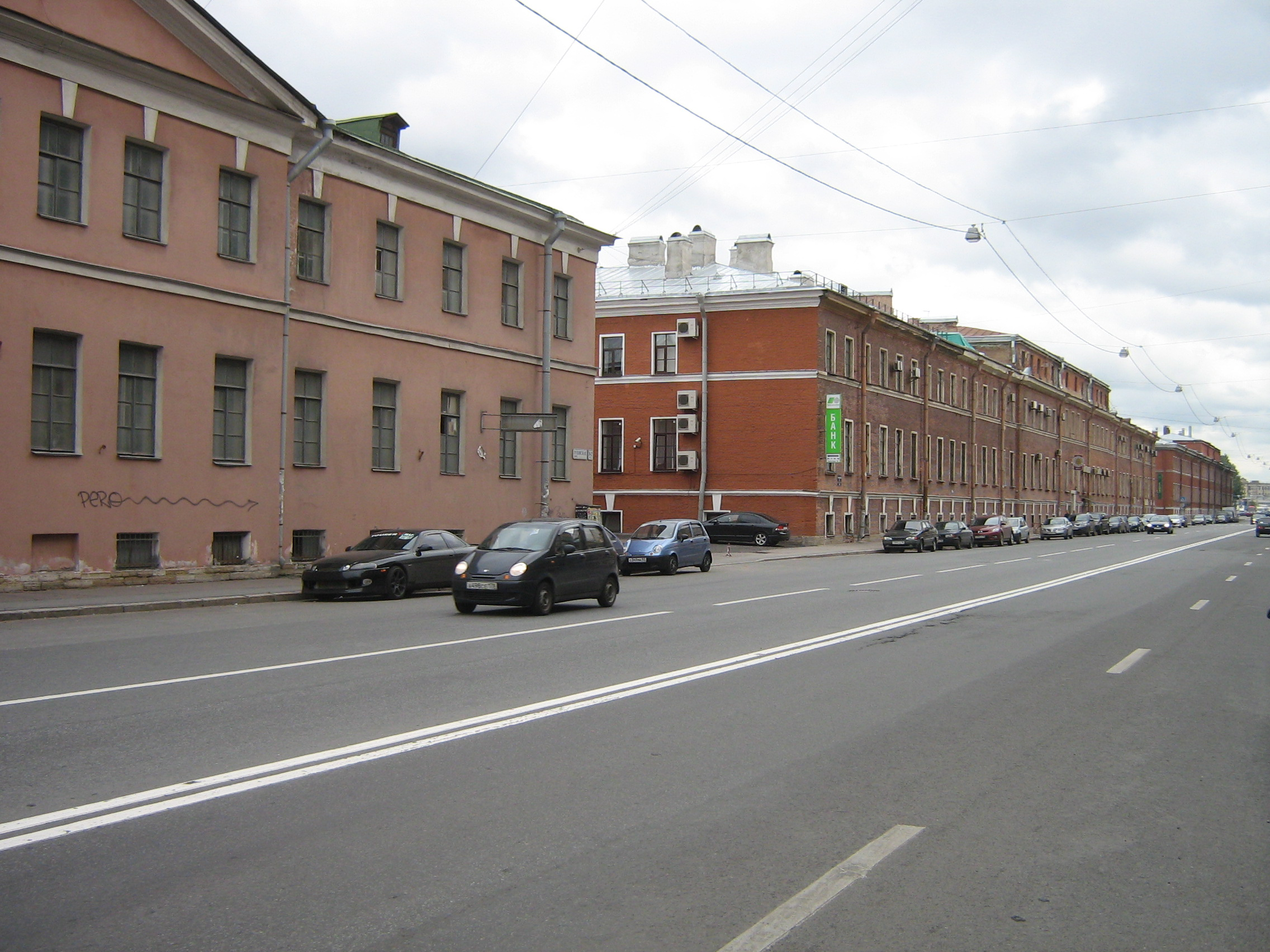
Regimental barracks in St Petersburg 2011

At the time of its creation, the LG Jaeger Regiment was based in the Semyeonov barracks in the street Svenigorodskaya ulitsa (later: Old Jaeger-street; Starojaegerskaya ulitsa). Afterwards the regiment was relocated to the especially newly built New Jaeger Barracks in the street Rusovskaya ulitsa, No. 14, No. 16 und No. 18.

The winter barracks of the regiment: the so-called "Petersburg quarters", was located close to the Semyenov place.

=== Regimental church ===
The Lifeguard Jaeger church was consecrated to "Saint and martyr Myron". Emperor Nicholas I financed the building from the Privy Purse. The church itself was located close to the riverside of the Obvodnyi canal, near the estuary to the Vvedenskiy canal. It was constructed during the period from 1849 to 1854 in memory to the victory of the coalition forces of Russia and Prussia in the Battle of Kulm against Napoleon, August 17, 1813, and the day of Saint Miron. Building was according to the plans of the architect Konstantin Thon. Distinguished officers of the regiment were laid to rest there.

The church also served as a war memorial to the fallen in World War I. However, following the suppression of the Russian Orthodox Church the church of was used as a storehouse up to 1930. In 1934 the already-damaged building was demolished. Today the former location of the church contains only a carwash. In line with city and church plans, the historic regimental church is to be reconstructed in accordance with the original plans and documents.

== Colours ==
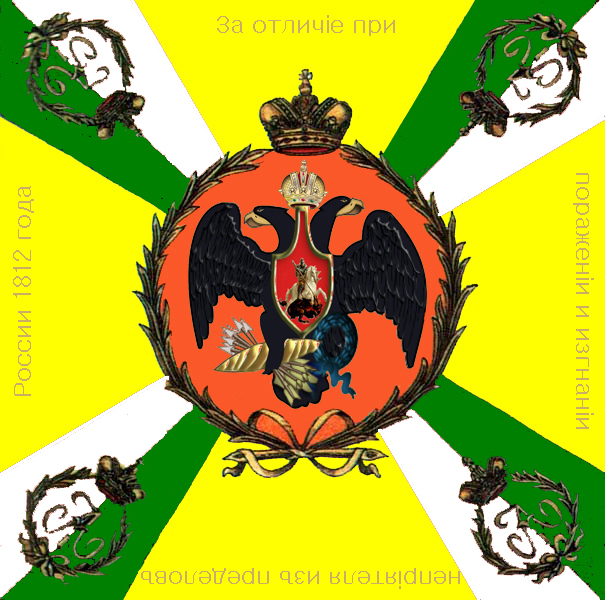
Ordinance flag, issue 1813

Colour (to the 100th anniversary 1796-1896)

== Uniforms and physical appearance ==
Throughout its history under the Russian Empire, the regiment wore the standard uniform of the Infantry of the Imperial Guard, which from 1683 to 1914 was predominantly of a dark green (eventually verging on black) colour. The main distinctions of the Lifeguard Jaeger Regiment were the light green facings (plastron, cuffs and shoulder straps) edged in white piping. Collars were of the same dark green as the tunic; piped in red and worn with distinctive regimental patterns of braid (litzen). In addition, the tsar's monogram appeared on the soldiers' crimson shoulder straps and officers' epaulettes (see charts below). In 1896, in recognition of service during the Russo-Turkish War, the entire regiment received the right to wear small bronze scrolls enscribed "For Telich 12 October 1877" on its full-dress shakos. This distinction continued until World War I.

A peculiarity of the Russian Imperial Guard was that recruits for most regiments were required to meet certain criteria of physical appearance, in order to provide a standardised appearance on parade. This tradition was taken so seriously that during the 19th century the tsar himself might make the selection from a line of new recruits, chalking the regimental initial on the coat of each recruit. For the Lifeguard Jaeger Regiment conscripts were selected for being relatively short and slim in build.

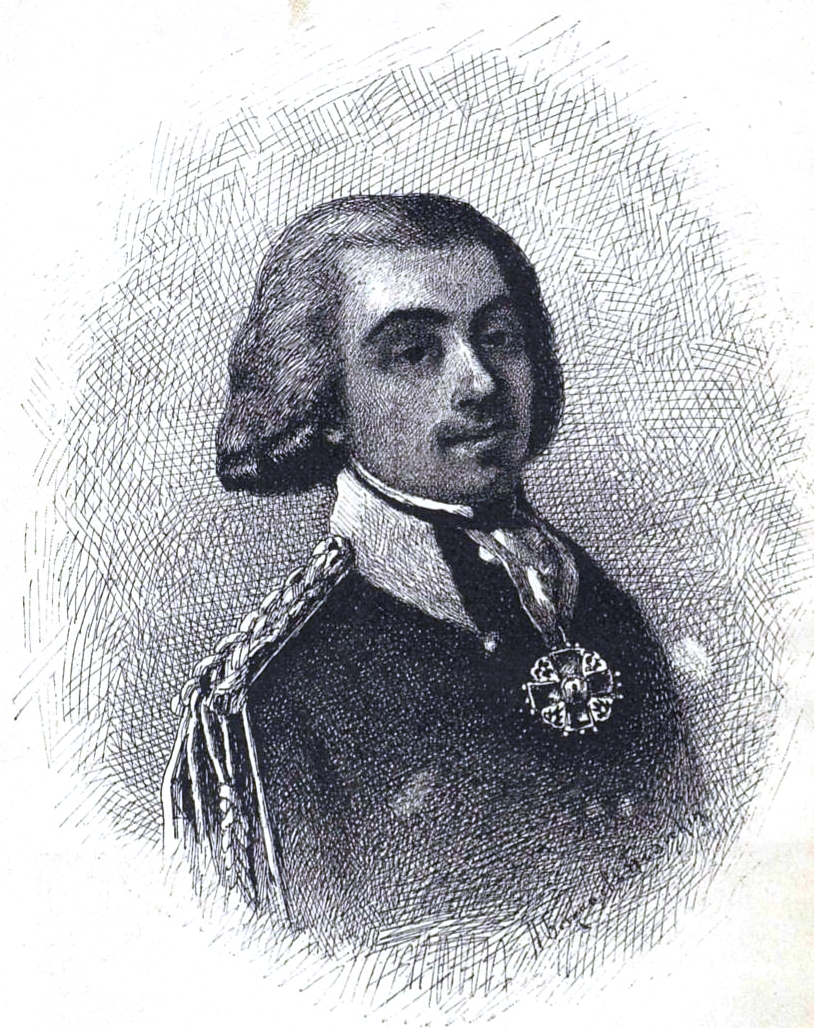
А.М. Rachinski c1800 — first regimental commanding officer

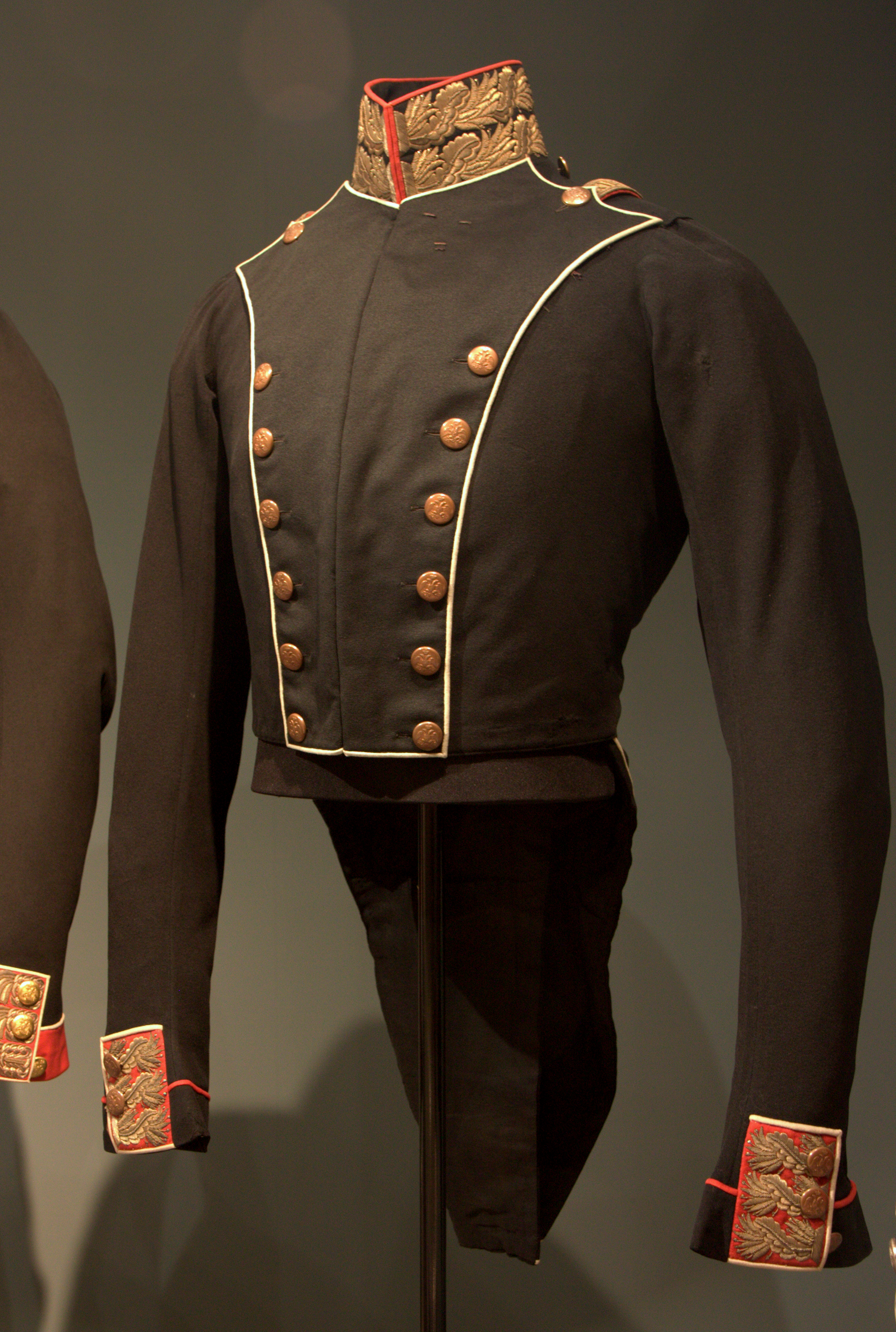
Tailcoat uniform worn by Nicholas I c1840 — as honour commander

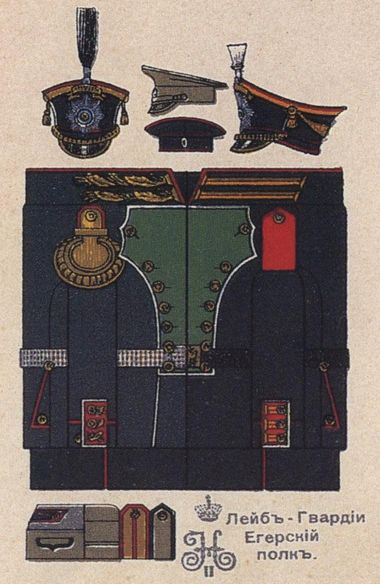
Full dress for officers and men 1907–17

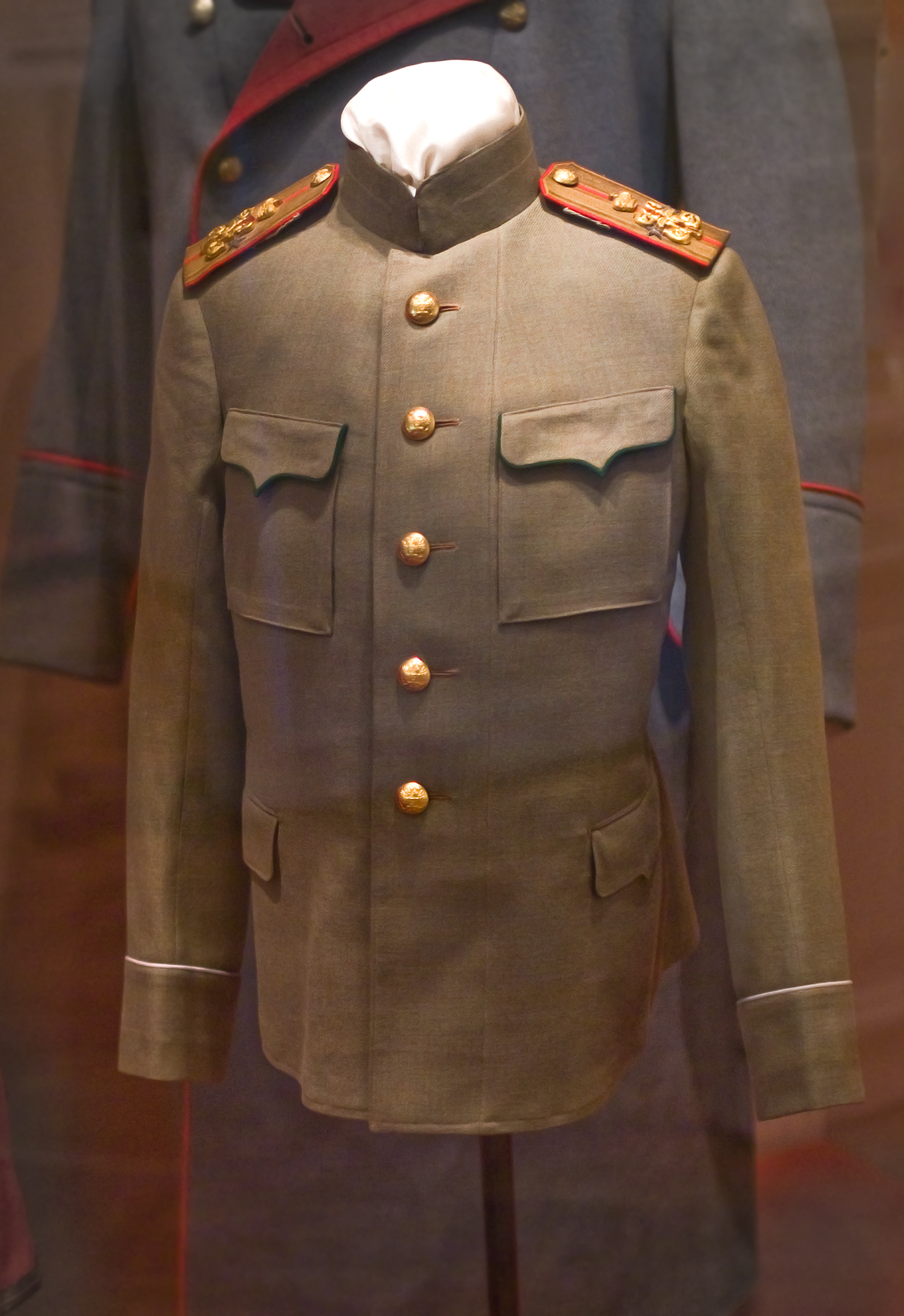
Officer's "French" (service tunic) about 1910

=== Bugle-horns ===
The regiment had the distinction of carrying silver trumpets with the engraving "For distinction in the Battle of Kulm 17 August 1813". Nicholas II extended this privilege to include the issue of 63 bugle-horns to the Lifeguard Jaegers in place of the drums and fifes of other infantry regiments.

== Colonels-in-chief of the regiment ==
The table below contains the regiment's chiefs or honour commanders from 1796 to 1917.

Period	Name	Rank	Note
November 9, 1796 — June 9, 1800	Rachinsky, Anton Michailovich	Podpolkovnik	1800 Generalleutnant
June 9, 1800 — September 12, 1812	Pyotr Bagration	Major general	1809 General of the infantry
November 27, 1813 — June 15, 1831	Konstantin Pavlovich Romanov	Tsarevich (heir apparent) and Grand Duke of Russia	
June 25, 1831 — February 18, 1855	Nicholas I	Emperor of Russia	
February 19, 1855 — March 1, 1881	Alexander II	Emperor of Russia	
March 2, 1881 — October 21, 1894	Alexander III	Emperor of Russia	2nd chief from October 28, 1866
November 2, 1894 — March 4, 1917	Nicholas II	Emperor of Russia	

== Battles ==
The LG Jaeger Regiment participated in the Napoleonic Wars, Russo-Turkish War of 1828–1829, the campaign to put down the November Uprising in Poland in 1830-31, Russo-Turkish War of 1877–1878 and First World War. The table below contains extracts from the combat calendar of the regiment.

1805 — 1878

- 1805-07 — Napoleonic Wars:
  - 20.11.1805 battle of Austerlitz
  - 24.5.1807 — battle of Lomitten
  - 2.6.1807 — battle of Friedland
- 1808-09 — Finnish War:
  - 10,15, 18.6.1808 — in fights of the town Kuopio
  - 15.10.1808 — fight of Lake Porovesi (close to town of Idensalmi (Iisalmi))
  - 29-30.10.1808 — battle of Idensalmi
  - 20.11.1808 — occupation of Uleåborg (Oulu)
  - 26.2.-7.3.1809 — Åland Expedition (one battalion) in the corps of Pyotr Bagration
- 1812 — French invasion of Russia
  - 5.8.1812 — Battle of Smolensk
  - 24-26 August 1812 — Battle of Borodino
  - 5.11.1812 — battle in the area of Krasny-Dobroe
- 1813-14 — battles abroad:
  - 8-9 May 1813 — battle of Bautzen
  - 17.8.1813 — battle of Kulm
  - 4, 6.10.1813 — Battle of Leipzig
  - 19.3.1814 — occupation of Paris
- 1828—1829 — Russo-Turkish War
  - 28.8.-29.9.1828 — conquest and occupation of the Varna region
  - 10.9.1828 — fight of Hadshi-Hassan-Lap
  - 14.9.1828 — assault and occupation of the strong point close to redoubt No. 12 in the Varana region
  - 16.9.1828 — fight of the Varana region (close to liman Devno)
  - 18.9.1828 — fight of Kurtepe

1914 — 1917 First World War:

- 20.8.1914 — encounter battle of Vladislavo
- 24.8.1914 — fight of the vils. Kshchonov, Gelchv
- 25-26 August 1914 — fight of the vils. Zarshov, Urshulin
- 2.9.1914 — fight of the Krcheshov BP
- 10-13 October 1914 — fights in the region Ivanogorod (in reserv)
- 19-21 October 1914 — struggles in the region of the vil. Lagov
- 22.10.1914 — fight of the vils. Khmelnik, Lagevniki
- 23.10.1914 — occupation town Pinchov, reg. Nida
- 3-7 November 1914 — fights in the region: position Skala - sel. Sulashov
- 11.11.1914 — fight of the vils. Poremba, Dzerzhna
- 12.1914-01.1915 — regiment in reserv
- 5.2.1915 — fight of the vils. Gorki, Kobylin
- 6, 19.2.1915 — fight of the vil. Vysoke-Malo, hill «85,0»
- 16-18 July 1915 — fight of the vil. Krupe
- 19-20 July 1915 — fight of the vil. Stavok
- 30.7.1915 — fight of the vil. Pertilov
- 1.8.1915 — fight of the vil. Goleshov
- 29.8.1915 — fight of the vils. Ulichely, Antoneytsy
- 30.8.-3.9.1915 — fights in the region: lake Korve — vil. Kramnishki
- 6.9.1915 — fights in the region: m. Soly — vil. Kzenzuvskie Zaezertsy
- 8.9.1915 — fights on lake Rishoe, vils. Antonishki, Andresheevtsy
- 9, 13.9.1915 — fight of the vil. Menki
- 16, 17, 22.9.1915 — defence battles in the area of Smorgon
- 10.1915-6.1916 — regiment in reserve
- 15-16 July 1916 — assault in the region: vil. Raymesto on the river Stokhod
- 24.7.-24.8.1916 — BP in the region Kukharsky forest
- 30.8.-15.9.1916 — BP in the region Svinyukhinsky forest
- 9.1916-5.1917 — position fights in the region: Svinyukhinsky forest, Kvadrat forest, and forest Sapog on the Stokhod road
- 23.6.1917 — assault of vil. Tavotloki
- 6-15 July 1917 — defence towns Tarinopol, Zbarazh

== Famous people ==
The table below contains a selection famous people, who served in the LG Jaeger Regiment.

- Aleksei Antonov — General of the Army, member of the supreme command, Chief of General Staff 1945-46, 1st CS of the coalition armed forces of the Warsaw Pact member states.
- Aleksey Arbuzov — General of the Infantry, participant in the Napoleonic Wars
- Ivan Armsgeymer — bandmaster, composer
- Aleksey Baiov — lieutenant general, Russian military historian
- Yevgeny Baratynsky — poet
- Nikolay Baumgarten — general, participant Russo-Turkish War (1828–29), military educationalist
- Yakov Bologovsky
- Karl Vrangel — general of the infantry
- Yevgeny Graf — lieutenant general
- Boris Regua — major general
- Aleksandr Gueldenschtubbe — general of the infantry
- Michael Grabbe — general
- Onufry Kvitsinsky — general
- Aleksey Kologrivov — major general
- Kibrian Kondratovich — general of the infantry
- Nikolay Krivtsov — captain of the LG Jaerger Regiment
- Fyodor Lindfors — major general
- Michail Matsnev — major general
- Pyotp Nesterov — lieutenant general
- Vladimir Notbek — general of the infantry
- Vasily Ovander — lieutenant general, participant in the Napoleonic Wars
- Gavriil Okunev — major general
- Ivan Pavlov — general of the infantry
- Stepan Polyeshov — lieutenant general
- Aleksandr Ridiger — major general
- Boris Richter — lieutenant general
- Fyodor Sazonov — major general
- Pyetr Stepanov — general of the infantry
- Ilya Tutaev —
- Ivan Cherkmaryov — lieutenant general
- Alfons Shanyavsky — goldmine owner
- Ivan Shachovskoy — general of the infantry
- Vyacheslav Shteyngel — general of the infantry
- Dmitry Shcherbachev — general of the infantry

== Commanders ==
The table below contains the commanding officers of the regiment.

- 7 March 1805 — 19 November 1809 — polkovnik Guillaume Emmanuel Guignard, vicomte de Saint-Priest
- 19 December 1809 — 29 May 1821 — polkovnik (from Nov. 21, 1812 major general) Karl von Bistram
- 10 August 1821 — 14 March 1825 — major general Yevgeny Golovin
- 14 March 1825 — 10 September 1828 — polkovnik (later major general) Pavel Gartong
- 13 September 1831 — 3 May 1833 — major general Pavel Shtegelman
- 02.04.1833 — 22.09.1841 — major general Aleksandr von Moller
- 22.09.1841 — 20.03.1850 — major general Vcevolod Solovyov
- 20.03.1850 — 02.04.1855 — major general Osip Musnitsky
- 02.04.1855 — 29.02.1856 — major general Yakov Voropay
- 29.02.1856 — 23.04.1861 — major general Wilhelm Hansen
- 23.04.1861 — 25.05.1863 — major general Baron Erst von Willebrand
- 25.05.1863 — 06.12.1864 — major general
- 06.12.1864 — 08.02.1868 — major general Michael Koropotkin
- 13.02.1868 — 17.04.1876 — polkovnik Aleksandr Ellis
- 17.04.1876 — 17.04.1880 — polkovnik (from Oct. 12, 1877 major general) Aleksey Chelishchev
- 17.08.1880 — 04.05.1887 — major general Aleksandr Frezer
- 18.05.1887 — 17.02.1891 — major general Khozrev Dolukhanov
- 17.02.1891 — 24.11.1894 — major general Ivan Maltsov
- 24.11.1894 — 20.11.1895 — major general Pavel Shubalov
- 28.11.1895 — 25.04.1900 — major general Andrey Cherkmaryov
- 11.07.1900 — 03.06.1903 — major general Konstantin Rozen
- 03.06.1903 — 18.02.1906 — major general Leonid-Otto Sirelius
- 18.02.1906 — 10.07.1908 — major general Andrei Zayonchkovski
- 10.07.1908 — 14.12.1913 — major general Vladimir Yablochin
- 14.12.1913 — 02.02.1916 — major general Aleksandr Bukovsky
- 02.02.1916 — 10.04.1917 — polkovnik (from Apr. 5, 1816 major general) Boris Grekov
- 05.04.1917 — 08.09.1917 — polkovnik Oleksander Hrekov
- 08.09.1917 — 12.1917 — polkovnik Fyodor Shtakelberg
