= Nikolai Sukhozanet =

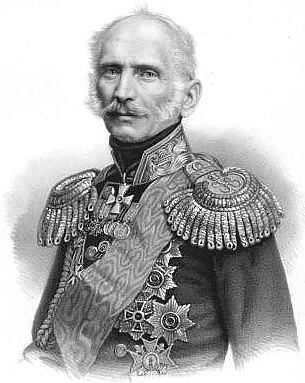

Minister of War of the Russian Empire
- In office 1856–1861
- Preceded by: Vasily Dolgorukov
- Succeeded by: Dmitry Milyutin

Personal details
- Born: 1794
- Died: July 22, 1871 Kaluga, Kaluga Governorate, Russian Empire
- Relatives: Ivan Sukhozanet (brother)
- Occupation: Military officer, politician

Military service
- Battles/wars: French invasion of Russia; War of the Sixth Coalition; November Uprising; Crimean War

Nikolai Onufrievich Sukhozanet (Russian: Никола́й Ону́фриевич Сухозане́т) (1794 – 22 July 1871) was an Imperial Russian Army general and statesman.

Nikolai Sukhozanet was born in a noble family of Vitebsk Governorate. During the Napoleon's invasion of Russia he fought in numerous battles and finished the campaign in Paris in the rank of lieutenant of artillery. His awards included Order of St. Vladimir of 4th degree and Order of St. Anna of 2nd degree.

After the war he occupied different positions in the 1st Army and in 1824 was promoted to Major General. When the November Uprising began he led the Staff of artillery in the acting army. He distinguished himself in the Battle of Ostrołęka and received the Order of St. George of 3rd degree. From 1836 to 1849 he commanded the 4th artillery division. From 1849 until the Battle of Chernaya River of Crimean War he commanded the artillery of the acting army, after that Sukhozanet got the 3rd Corps and the Southern Army the next year.

On 17 April 1856 he became the Minister of War. Emperor Alexander II has put him two main tasks: the reduction of army's expenses and the deep reform of the army. The first task was solved but the second was completely abandoned by Sukhozanet.

During his minister's term he two times acted as a Governor-General of Warsaw – first time during the illness of Prince Mikhail Gorchakov and second after resign of Karl Lambert. Because of bad health he left on 6 October 1861 the army and on 9 November resigns his post of minister.

Preceded by Vasily Dolgorukov	Minister of War; 1856 – 1861	Succeeded by Dmitry Milyutin
Preceded by Mikhail Gorchakov	Namestnik of Kingdom of Poland; 16 May 1861 – 1 August 1861	Succeeded by Karl Lambert
Preceded by Karl Lambert	Namestnik of Kingdom of Poland; 11 October 1861 – 22 October 1861	Succeeded by Alexander Liders
