= Locally venerated saint =

Regional saint in Christianity

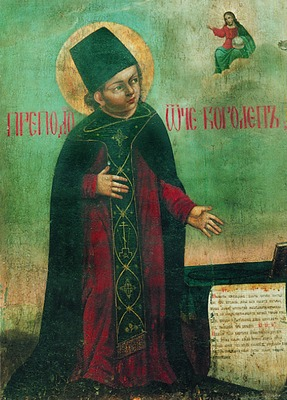
Bogolep of Chorny Yar, venerated in Chyorny Yar, Astrakhan Oblast, Russia

A locally venerated saint or local saint (Russian: местночтимый святой, romanized: mestnochtimy svyatoy) is a saint who was canonized within a particular diocese or venerated only in a certain region.

== Examples ==
- Basil of Pavlovsky Posad
- Bogolep of Chorny Yar
- Seraphim Rose

== See also ==
- Cult of saints in Anglo-Saxon England
- List of Eastern Orthodox saint titles
- Beatification
