= Dmitry Milyutin =

Russian general and noble (1816–1912)

General Field Marshal Dmitry Milyutin
- Дмитрий Милютин
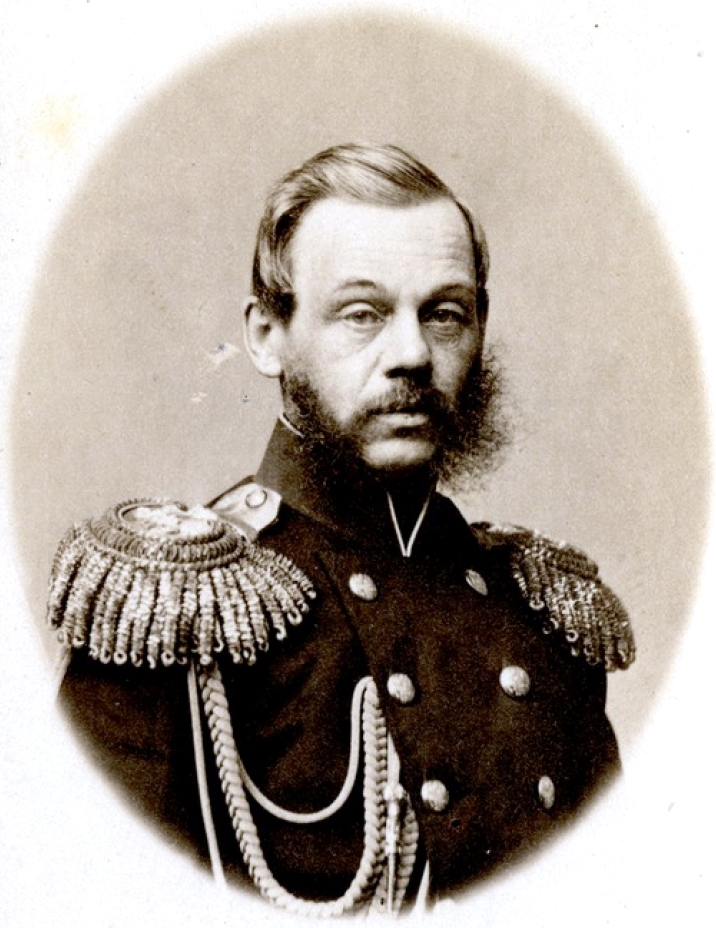
- Milyutin in 1865

7th Minister of War of the Russian Empire
- In office 21 November 1861 – 2 June 1881
- Monarchs: Alexander II; Alexander III
- Chairman of the Committee of Ministers: Dmitry Nikolayevich Bludov; Pavel Pavlovich Gagarin; Nikolay Pavlovich Ignatyev; Pyotr Valuyev
- Preceded by: Nikolay Sukhozanet
- Succeeded by: Pyotr Vannovsky

Vice Minister of War
- In office 11 September 1860 – 21 November 1861
- Monarch: Alexander II
- Chairman of the Committee of Ministers: Dmitry Nikolayevich Bludov
- Minister of War: Nikolay Sukhozanet

Personal details
- Born: 28 June 1816 Moscow, Moscow Governorate, Russia
- Died: 25 January 1912 (aged 95) Simeiz, Taurida Governorate, Russia
- Resting place: Novodevichy Convent, Moscow, Russia

Military service
- Allegiance: Russia
- Branch/service: Imperial Russian Army
- Years of service: 1836–1881
- Rank: General field marshal
- Battles/wars: Caucasian War; Crimean War; Russo-Turkish War
- Awards: see § Honours and awards

Count Dmitry Alekseyevich Milyutin (Russian: Дмитрий Алексеевич Милютин; 10 July [O.S. 28 June] 1816 – 7 February [O.S. 25 January] 1912) was a Russian military historian and politician who served as the minister of war from 1861 to 1881. He was also the last Russian general field marshal (1898). He was responsible for sweeping military reforms that changed the face of the Russian army in the 1860s and 1870s.

== Early career ==
Milyutin graduated from the Moscow University School in 1833 and Nicholas Military Academy in 1836. Unlike his brother Nikolai Milyutin, who chose to pursue a career in civil administration, Dmitry volunteered to take part in the Caucasian War (1839–45). After sustaining a grave wound, he returned to the military academy to deliver lectures as a professor.

In the following years, Milyutin earned a considerable reputation as a brilliant scholar. He emphasized the scientific value of military statistics and authored the first comprehensive study of the subject, which earned him the Demidov Prize for 1847. Milyutin regarded Suvorov as a model for military commanders and the Italian campaign of 1799 as the pinnacle of his career, elaborating these views in a detailed account of the campaign, published in five volumes in 1852 and 1853. This work covers the War of the Second Coalition of 1799 in its core, inclusive of confrontations in Germany, Italy, Switzerland, and at sea, and everything about Russian expeditions, including Switzerland and the Netherlands. It also touches on the political aspects of the aftermath of the war of 1799.

Capitalizing on his knowledge, Milyutin analyzed the causes of Russia's defeat in the Crimean War and framed some radical proposals for military reforms. His ideas were approved by Alexander II, who appointed Milyutin to the post of Minister of War in 1861. Several years earlier, Milyutin took part in the capture of Imam Shamil, thus helping bring the prolonged Caucasian War to an end.

== Minister of War ==
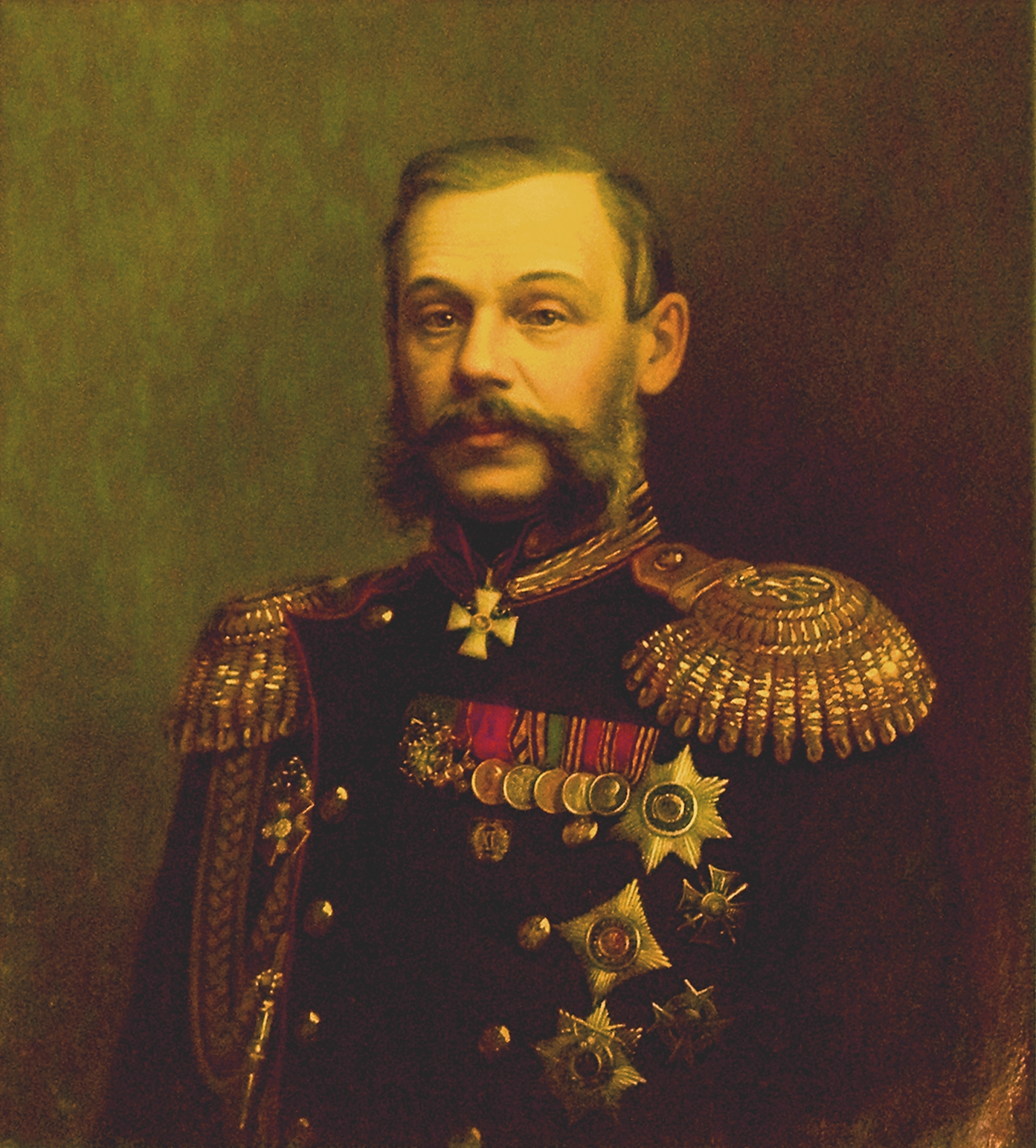
General Dmitry Alekseyevich Milyutin at the Military Historical Museum of Artillery, Engineers and Signal Corps

Milyutin was the minister of War from 16 May 1861 to 21 May 1881. The military reforms introduced during Milyutin's long tenure resulted in the levy system being introduced to Russia and military districts being created across the country. Military service was declared compulsory to all males aged 21 for 6 years, instead of the previous 25 years. This applied to all males including nobles. The system of military education was also reformed, and elementary education was made available to all the draftees. Milyutin's reforms are regarded as a milestone in the history of Russia. Before his reforms in, the Russian Army had no constant barracks and was billeted in dugouts and shacks.

The success of his reforms was demonstrated during the Russo-Turkish War of 1877–1878. Milyutin's subtle leadership made itself felt during the peak of the conflict when the Russians failed three times in a row to take Pleven and many experts advised them to retreat. Milyutin promptly ordered the siege to be continued in a more orderly manner, which brought the war to a victorious end. At the close of the war, Milyutin set up a commission in order to investigate faulty supply of provisions and other problems that had surfaced during the siege. In recognition of his services, he was made a count and received all the Russian orders, including the Order of Saint Andrew.

Milyutin strongly advocated the deportation that formed the latter stage of the Circassian genocide, arguing that "eliminating the Circassians was to be an end in itself – to cleanse the land of hostile elements".

== Later life ==
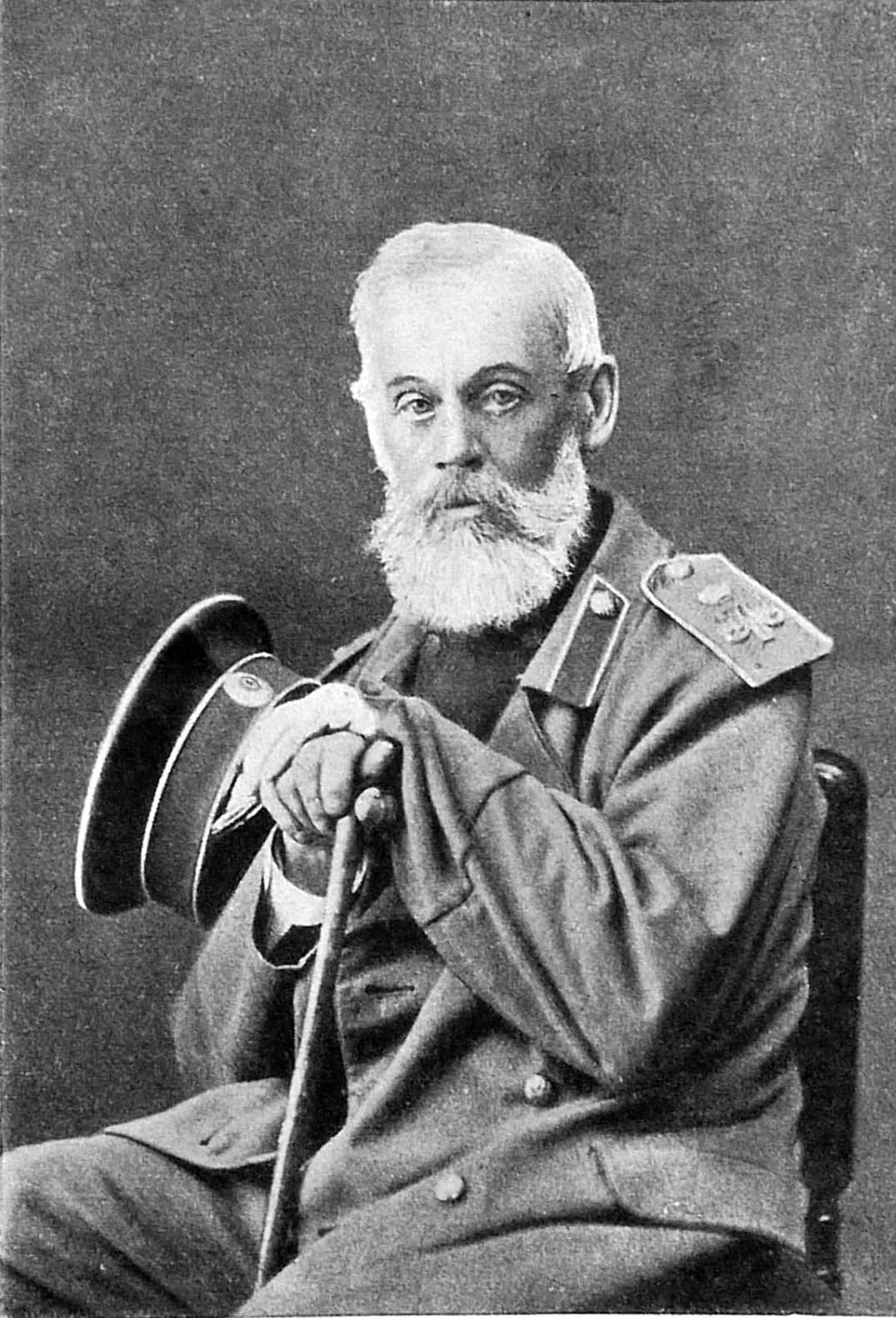
General Dmitry Milyutin

After the Congress of Berlin, Milyutin succeeded the ailing Alexander Gorchakov as the leader of the imperial foreign policy. Alexander II's assassination in 1881 rendered his position precarious, however, and after Konstantin Pobedonostsev, intent on reversing the liberal innovations of the previous reign, emerged as the most powerful policy-maker, Milyutin resigned his office. In 1898, when the 80th anniversary of Alexander II was celebrated, he was promoted to Field Marshal, the first man to receive this honour for many years and the last in the history of the Russian Empire. He died in Simeiz in 1912.

== Works ==
- The history of Russia's war with France during the reign of Emperor Paul I in 1799 [История войны России с Францией в царствование Императора Павла I в 1799 году]. "Written by Imperial order of Sovereign Emperor Nicholas I". In five volumes. Saint Petersburg. 1852–1853. Типография штаба военно-учебных заведений.

== Honours and awards ==
=== Domestic ===
- Order of St. Anna, 1st class
- Order of St. Anna, 2nd class
- Order of the White Eagle
- Order of St. Stanislaus, 1st class
- Order of St. Stanislaus, 3rd class
- Order of St. Vladimir, 1st class
- Order of St. Alexander Nevsky
- Order of St. Andrew
- Demidov Prize
- Order of St. George, 2nd class

=== Foreign ===
- Kingdom of Romania
  - Order of the Star of Romania
- Kingdom of Prussia:
  - Grand Cross of the Order of the Red Eagle, 9 September 1872
  - Pour le Mérite (military), 22 March 1879
  - Knight of the Order of the Black Eagle, 4 September 1879
- Austrian Empire:
  - Knight of the Imperial Order of the Iron Crown, 2nd Class, 1853
  - Grand Cross of the Austrian Imperial Order of Leopold, 1872
- French Third Republic
  - Grand Cross of the Legion of Honour, September 1876
  - French Order of Academic Palms
- Kingdom of Sweden:
  - Knight of the Royal Order of the Seraphim, 19 July 1875
- Kingdom of Denmark:
  - Knight of the Order of the Elephant, 19 August 1876
- Kingdom of Hungary:
  - Grand Cross of the Royal Hungarian Order of St. Stephen, 1874
- Grand Duchy of Mecklenburg-Strelitz
  - House Order of the Wendish Crown
- Principality of Serbia
  - Order of the Cross of Takovo
- Principality of Montenegro
  - Order of Prince Danilo I
- Qajar dynasty
  - Order of the Lion and the Sun

== Cultural references ==
- The Filipino novel Revolution: 80 Days (2022) featured Milyutin as a friend of the protagonist Richard Haze.
