= Bogolep of Chorny Yar =

Russian Orthodox child schema-monk and saint (1647–1654)

Saint Bogolep of Chorny Yar
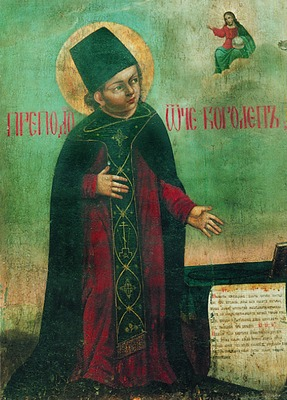
- 19th-century Russian icon

Venerable Child
- Born: Boris Yakovlevich Ushakov; Russian: Бори́с Яковлевич Ушаков; 2 May 1647; Moscow, Russia
- Died: 1 August 1654 (aged 7); Chorny Yar, Russia
- Venerated in: Russian Orthodox Church (locally), Russian Orthodox Old-Rite Church
- Canonized: 1918 by Russian Orthodox Church
- Feast: July 24 and the second Sunday after Pentecost
- Patronage: Astrakhan Oblast, especially Chorny Yar; sick children

Bogolep of Chorny Yar (Russian: Боголеп Черноярский; secular name: Boris Yakovlevich Ushakov; Russian: Бори́с Яковлевич Ушаков; 2 May 1647 – 1 August 1654) was a Russian Orthodox child schema-monk, a locally venerated saint of the Russian Orthodox Church, with the title of Venerable.

== Life ==
He was born in Moscow into an old and influential Russian house of Ushakovs (accordingly, he was a distant relative of two later saints: the hieromonk Theodore of Sanaksar and the admiral Fyodor Ushakov). His father was a boyar named Yakov Lukich Ushakov. His mother named and Yekaterina Vasilyeva Ushakova. In his baptism, he was named Boris in honor of Prince Boris Vladimirovich. His father was appointed the voyevoda of Chorny Yar (now Astrakhan Oblast, Russia) in 1651. The Life tells that the child was very pious from an early age: as a baby he observed fasts on Wednesday and Friday, cried at the sound of the bell, thereby indicating that he should be carried to church.

Boris was in very poor health: at the age of seven, he developed an ulcer on his leg, which soon passed, but a new disease called "chechui" (ulcers on the face) began. One day he saw a wandering monk and was amazed by his vestments. Boris asked his parents to give him a haircut, saying that after that he would recover. The parents agreed and Boris was tonsured into a schema with the name Bogolep (Russian translation of the Greek name Theoprepius). According to the Life, the next day after taking the veil, he recovered, but a day later he fell ill with fever and died the same day. In various versions of the Life, the year of Bogolep's death differs: 1654 or 1659 (the first date is considered more appropriate to the hagiographic history). Bogolep was buried next to the church in honor of the Resurrection of the Lord, later a chapel was built over his grave.

== Literature ==
- Лебединский Я. В. Отрок схимонах Боголеп Черноярский // Астраханские епархиальные ведомости. 1877. — No. 3. — С. 11–15; No. 4. — С. 4–8; No. 5. — С. 5–11; No. 6. — С. 7–14; No. 7. — С. 7–11; No. 8. — С. 6–9.
- Праведный отрок схимник Боголеп // Русский паломник. 1893. — No. 10. — С. 145–147
- Леонид (Кавелин), архим. Предание в г. Чёрном Яре о схимнике Боголепе // Астраханские епархиальные ведомости. 1899. — No. 8. — С. 391–395.
- Иосиф (Марьян), иером. Жизнеописание схимонаха Боголепа Черноярского // Святые земли Астраханской. — Астрахань; Элиста, 2001. — С. 77–118.
- "Боголеп Черноярский". Православная энциклопедия (in Russian). Vol. V: «Бессонов — Бонвеч». 2002. pp. 455–456.
- Житие преподобного отрока схимонаха Боголепа Черноярского // Святые и подвижники благочестия земли астраханской. — [Астрахань], 2010. — С. 86–116.
- Ивашнева Л. Л. Агиографические народные легенды Нижней Волги: отрок схимонах Боголеп // Русская литература. — 2014. — No. 3. — С. 84–105.
