= Yusuf Pasha =

Yusuf Pasha could refer to the following Ottoman statesmen:

- Sinanüddin Fakih Yusuf Pasha (d. 1364), grand vizier
- Sinan Yusuf Pasha (d. 1553), Ottoman admiral
- Cığalazade Yusuf Sinan Pasha (d. 1605), Ottoman admiral and grand vizier
- Yusuf Sayfa Pasha (d. 1625), Ottoman governor of Tripoli Eyalet
- Emirgûneoğlu Yusuf Paşa (d. 1641), a Safavid official who decided to defect to the Ottoman side for Murad IV
- Silahdar Yusuf Pasha (d. 1646), Ottoman admiral
- Ağa Yusuf Pasha (d. 1712), grand vizier
- Koca Yusuf Pasha (fl. 1786–1792), grand vizier
- Kunj Yusuf Pasha (fl. 1807–1810), Ottoman governor of Damascus
- Yusuf Karamanli (d. 1838), Ottoman pasha of Tripolitania
- Yusuf Izzet Pasha (d. 1876), Ottoman army general
- Yusuf Ziya Pasha (d. 1929), Ottoman ambassador to the United States
