= Märjamaa =

Borough in Estonia

- Borough
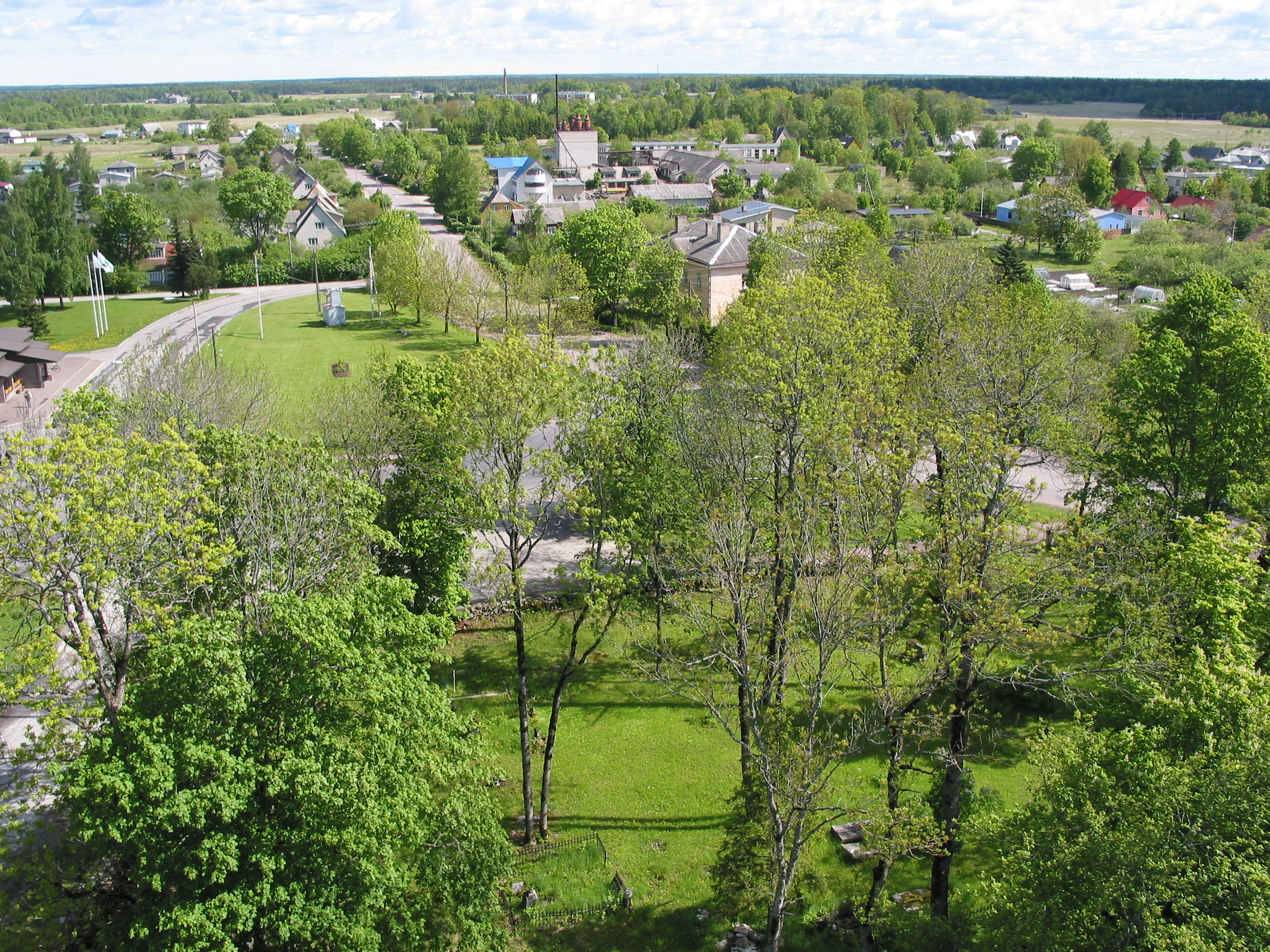
- View from the Märjamaa church

- Location in Estonia
- Coordinates: 58°54′36″N 24°25′56″E
- Country: Estonia
- County: Rapla County
- Municipality: Märjamaa Parish

Population (01.01.2008)
  - Total: 3,108

Märjamaa is a borough (Estonian: alev) in Rapla County, Estonia. It is the administrative center of Märjamaa Parish. Märjamaa has a population of 2,961 as of 29 November 2012, making it the largest settlement in the whole of Märjamaa Parish.

== Notable people ==
- Adam Otto von Bistram (1774 – 1828), a Baltic German commander in the Imperial Russian Army.
- Karl-Rudolf Silberg-Sillak (1906 – 1974), footballer, who played 52 games for Estonia
- Arvo Valton (born 1935 – 2024), writer and politician
- Ivo Eensalu (born 1949), actor and theatre director, director of the Estonian Drama Theatre, 1995 to 2001
- Sandra Nurmsalu (born 1988), singer, songwriter, violinist and local politician
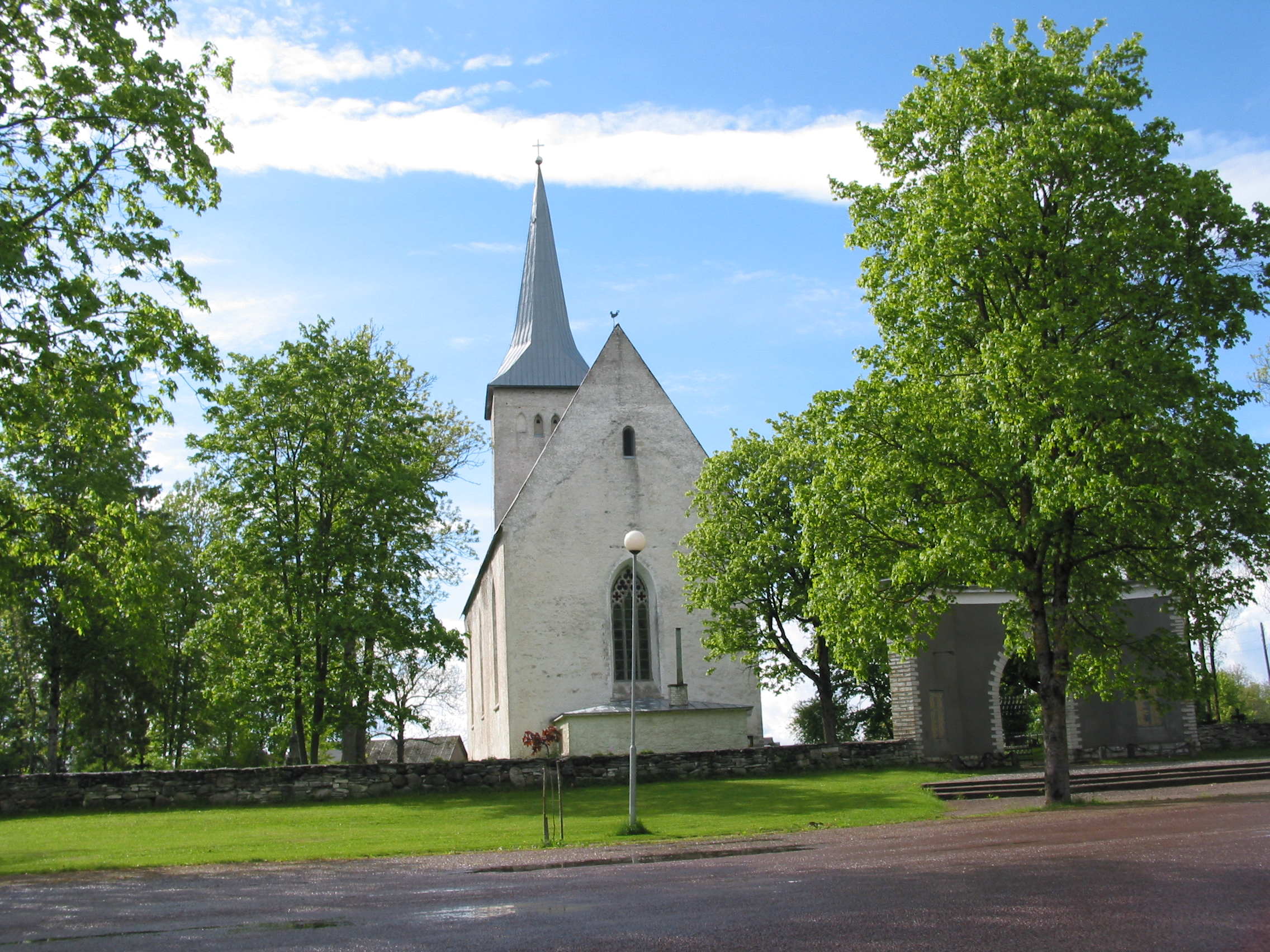
Marjamaa Church

== See also ==
- RFC Märjamaa
