= Pavel Ushakov =

Russian army general (1779–1853)

Pavel Nikolayevich Ushakov
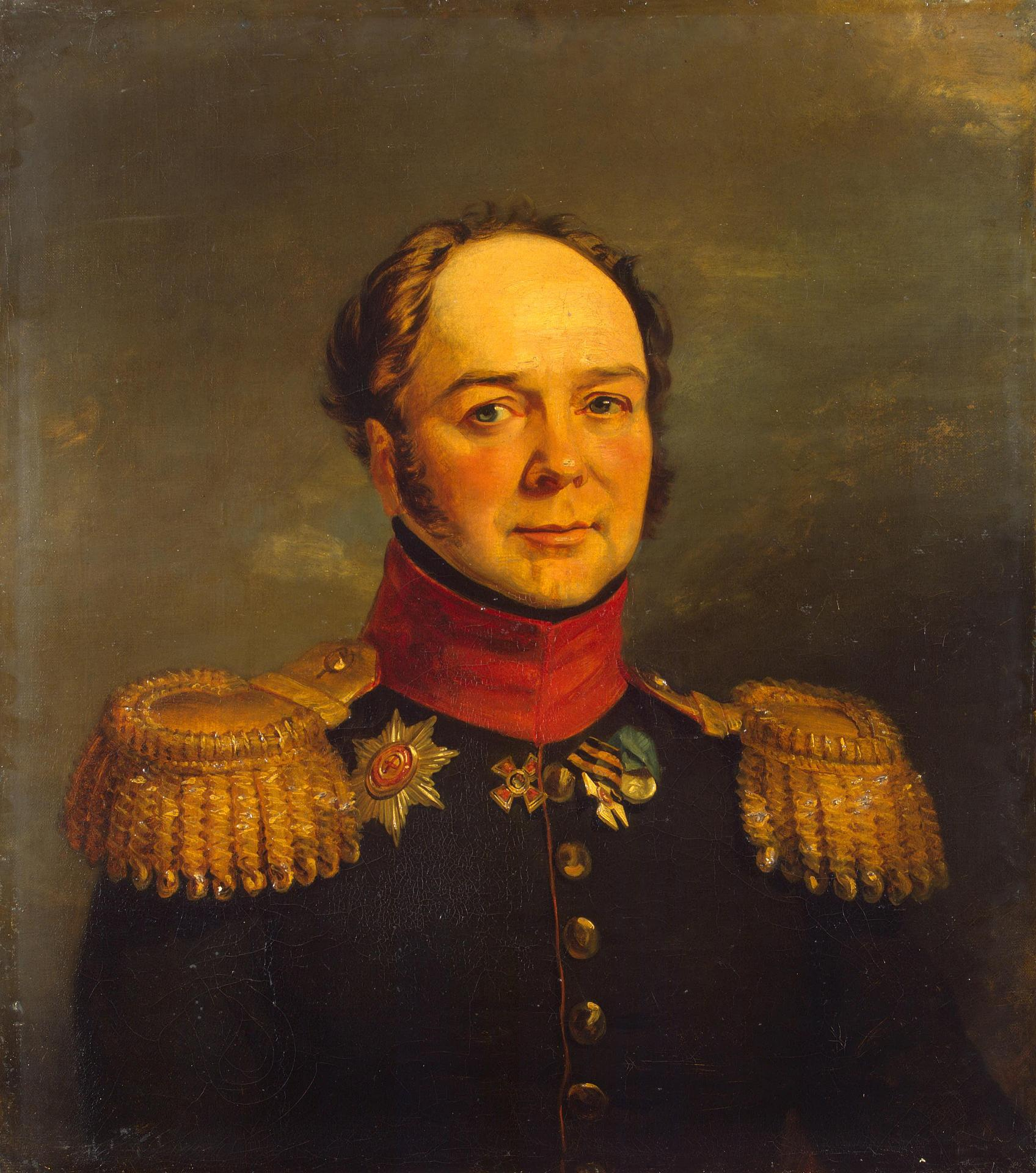
- Born: 2 November 1779; Potykino, Yaroslavl Province, Russian Empire
- Died: 1853 (aged 73–74)
- Relatives: Ushakov family
- Military career
- Allegiance: Russian Empire
- Branch: Imperial Russian Army
- Commands: 113th Starorus Russian Infantry Regiment
- Conflicts: Napoleonic Wars; War of the Third Coalition; War of the Fourth Coalition; French invasion of Russia; War of the Sixth Coalition; Russo-Turkish War (1828-29); November Uprising

Pavel Nikolayevich Ushakov (2 November 1779 – 1853) — Russian commander of the era of the Napoleonic Wars, general from the infantry of the Imperial Russian Army, adjutant general.

== Biography ==
Pavel Ushakov was born on 2 November 1779 in the village of Potykino, Yaroslavl Province, to a noble family of a real state adviser Nikolai Ivanovich Ushakov and Ekaterina Vasilyevna Telyakovskaya; younger brother of General Sergey Ushakov. He received his primary education at home, and then was brought up in the boarding house of Johann Mathias Schaden in the city of Moscow.

Almost from birth, he was recorded in the Preobrazhensky Life Guard Regiment as a lieutenant, and three years later he was transferred to the Izmailovsky Life Guard Regiment.

Bravely fought in the wars of the third and fourth coalitions; was wounded and marked by the shoulder straps of the colonel (11 August 1809).

After the Napoleonic army invaded Russia, Ushakov took an active part in the Patriotic War of 1812, fought in a number of key battles of this war, and for Borodino on 23 December 1812 he was awarded the Order of St. George of the 4th class. In retribution of zealous service and distinction rendered in the battle against the French troops of 1812 on 26 August at p. Borodin, where, commanding the Rylsky Infantry Regiment and setting an example of excellent courage, he helped to line up under the most severe card shots and, with such courageous, undaunted action, stopped the enemy's desire."

After the enemy was expelled from the borders of the empire, Ushakov took part in a foreign campaign of the Russian army during which he was promoted to major general on 15 September 1813, and was appointed chief of the Poltava Infantry Regiment on 28 September 1813.

Since 1815, Ushakov led one of the brigades of the 7th Infantry Division (Russian Empire).

From 30 August 1816 to 4 August 1817 he was retired.

Returning to military service, he was appointed to be in the army, then took command of the 2nd Brigade of the 9th Infantry Division (Russian Empire), and from 8 April 1821 the 2nd Brigade of the 4th Infantry Division (Russian Empire). On 24 October 1824 Ushakov was approved as the head of the 6th Infantry Division (Russian Empire).

22 August 1826 was promoted to lieutenant general.

For valor in the Russo-Turkish War (1828-29) 1 October 1828 was awarded the Order of St. George 3rd Class No. 408 “In retribution of the excellent courage shown in the battles against the Turks during the siege and capture of the fortress of Varna in 1828. He took part in the suppression of the Polish uprising.

On 6 December 1831, he was promoted to adjutant general, and on 16 April 1841, he was promoted to general from infantry.

From 25 October 1842 to 29 April 1844 Ushakov was in command of the 4th Infantry Corps, then took the chair of the Committee on the Wounded. When the embezzlement of 1 million rubles was revealed by the director of the Office of the Committee on the Wounded, A. G. Politkovsky, Ushakov was determined to be in the army, deprived of the rank of adjutant general, arrested and put on trial "for unrest, inaction of the authorities and the assumption of important state damage." On 11 April 1853, the court decided to expel Ushakov from service, recover the damage inflicted on him and imprison him for six months in the fortress, where he died from a "loss of strength and body disorder" without having lived a month after the indictment. He was buried at the Lazarevskoe Cemetery of the Alexander Nevsky Lavra in the city of Saint Petersburg.

== Family ==
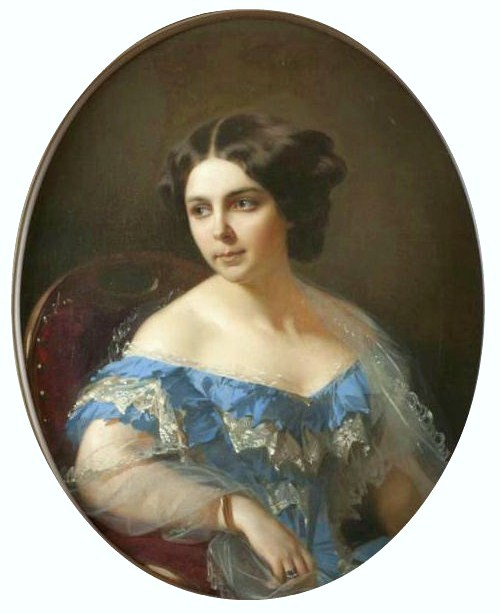
Ushakov's daughter, Olga Pavlovna Stakhovich (née Ushakova)

Since 1816 he was married to Sofya Gavrilovna Rodzianko (1802-1877), according to a contemporary, was the personification of all the beautiful: deep piety, unlimited devotion to her husband, love for children and love for one's neighbor. She died at night from a blow. In marriage, had 14 children, of which 11 died in infancy:

- Olga Pavlovna (1827-1902), since 1853 the wife of Alexander Alexandrovich Stakhovich (1830-1913). Grandson - Mikhail Aleksandrovich Stakhovich (politician).
- Zinaida Pavlovna (12 October 1830—?), Was baptized on 24 November 1830 in the church of the Hospital for the Poor with the perception of Uncle E. G. Rodzianko and grandmother M. M. Rodzianko.
- Alexander Pavlovich (25 August 1833—?), Was baptized on 21 September 1833 in the Simeonovskaya church with the perception of his sister Olga.
- Ekaterina Pavlovna (6 February 1835—?), Was baptized on 3 March 1835 in the Simeonovskaya church with the perception of uncle P. G. Rodzianko and P. S. Bernikov.
- Alexandra Pavlovna (08/10, 1838—?), Was baptized on 25 August 1839 in the Simeon Church with the perception of her sister Olga.

Military offices
Preceded by	Commander of the 113th Starorus Russian Infantry Regiment; 1812	Succeeded by

== Literature ==
- http://www.museum.ru/museum/1812/Persons/slovar/sl_u10.html (591—592)
