= Karl Lambert =

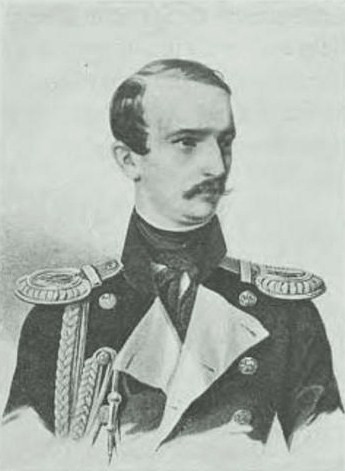
Karl Lambert

Count Karl Karlovich Lambert (Russian: Карл Карлович Ламберт; French: Charles-Alexandre comte de Lambert) (1815 – 20 July 1865) was a Russian General of Cavalry and Namestnik of the Kingdom of Poland from August to October 1861.

From 1840 to 1844, he fought against Chechen highlanders during the Caucasian War. In 1848, he became chief of staff of II Russian Corps suppressing the Hungarian Revolution of 1848.

On 14 October 1861, he instituted martial law in the territory of Congress Poland.
