= Karl von Bistram =

Russian commander (1770–1838)

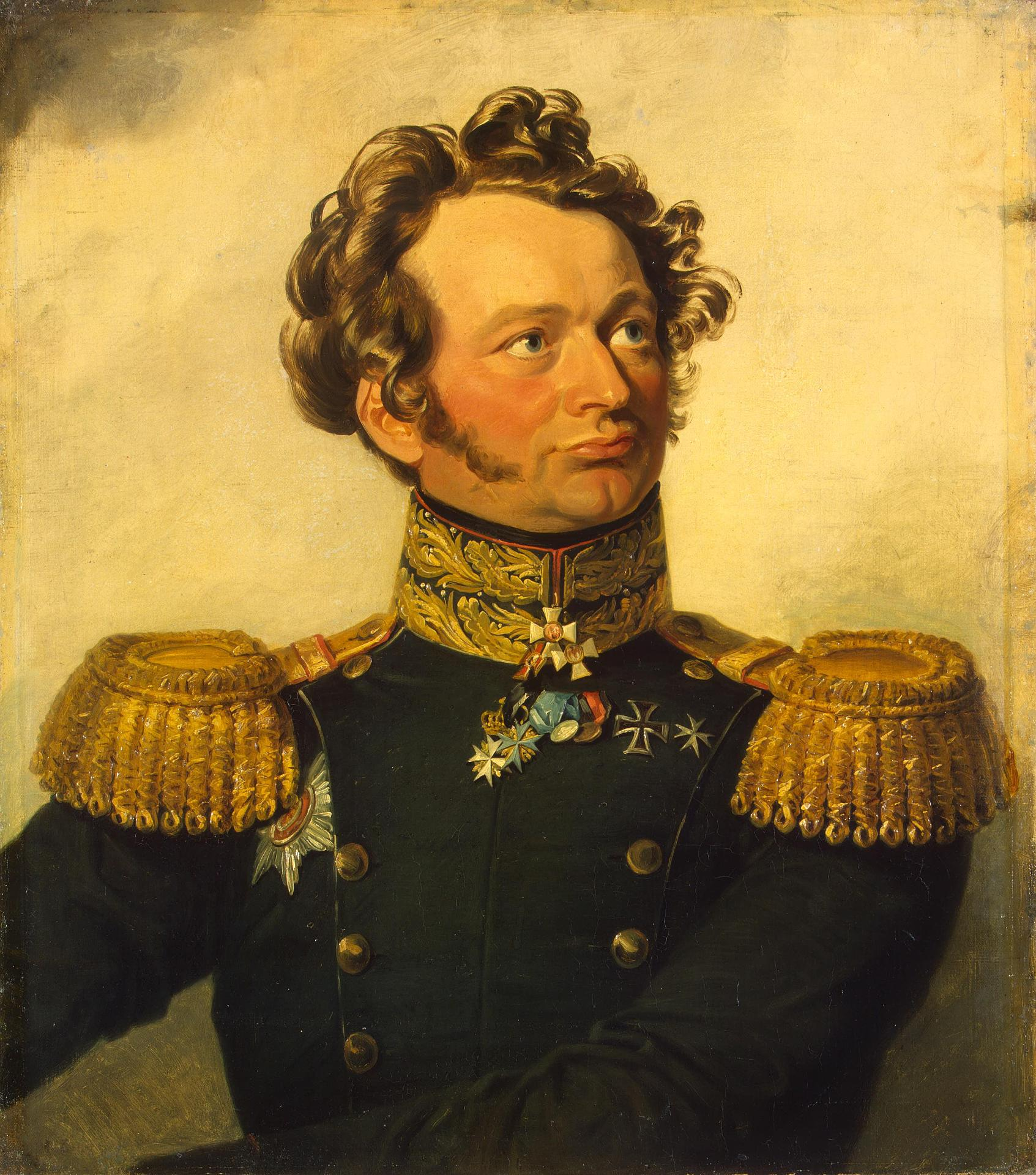
Portrait of Bistram by George Dawe, 1819–1824

Karl Heinrich Georg von Bistram or Karl Ivanovich Bistrom (Russian: Карл Иванович Бистром; 1770, Reval Governorate – 16 June 1838, Bad Kissingen) was a commander in the Imperial Russian Army during the Napoleonic Wars. He was from a Baltic German noble family, and his younger brother, Adam, also served in the war.

== Sources ==
- "Бистром, Карл Иванович" . Brockhaus and Efron Encyclopedic Dictionary (in Russian). 1906.
