= Romania in World War I =

- Part of the Eastern Front of World War I
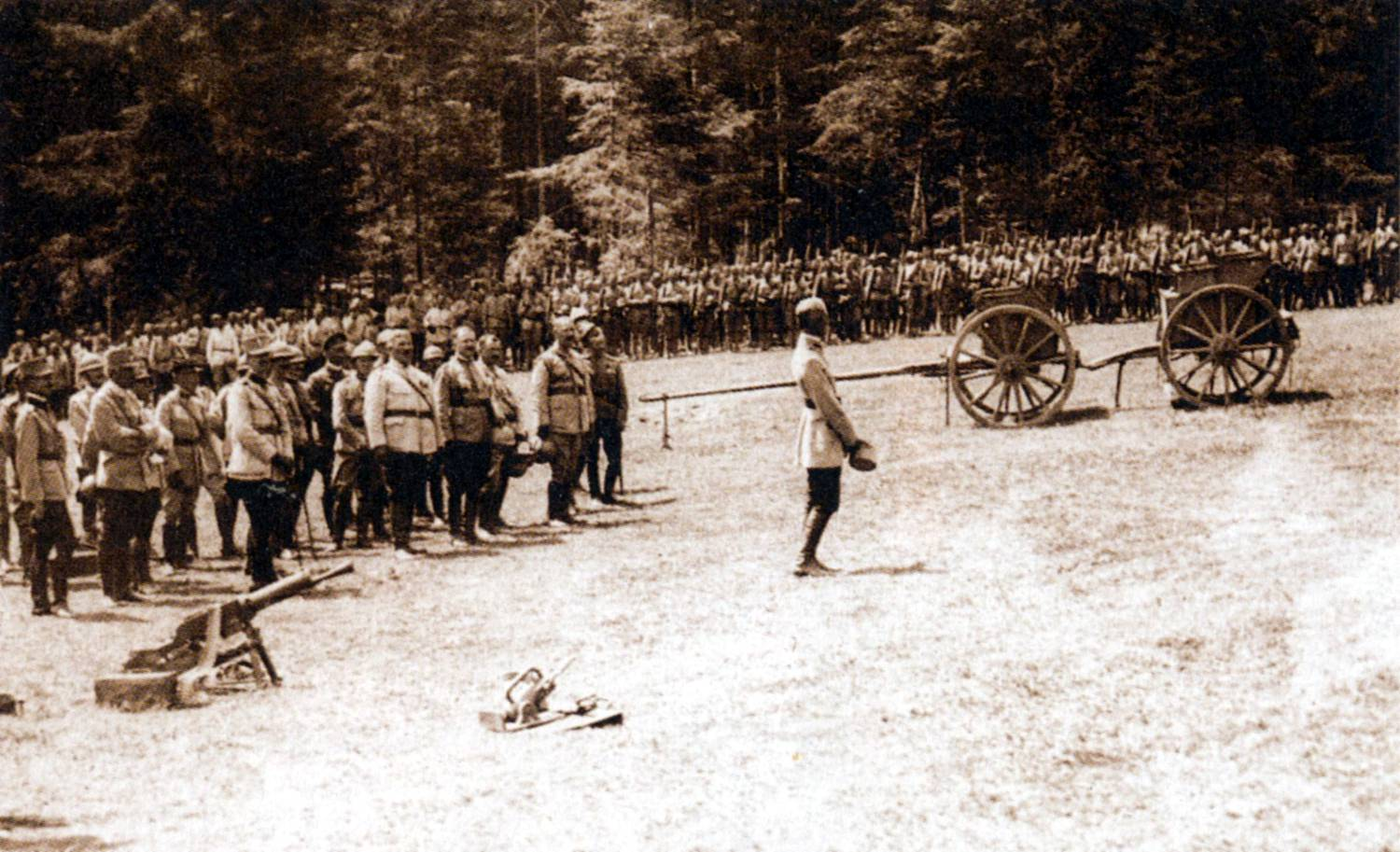
- Romanian troops at Mărășești battlefield in 1917.
Date	1st phase: 27 August 1916 – 10 January 1917; 2nd phase: 22 July – 3 September 1917; 3rd phase 10–11 November 1918
Location	Romania
Result	Central Powers victory in Wallachia and Dobruja (January 1917) Romanian victory in Western Moldavia and Basarabia (September 1917): Armistice of Focșani; Treaty of Bucharest; Allied victory (November 1918): Treaties of Versailles, Saint-Germain, Neuilly, and Trianon

Belligerents
Germany; Austria-Hungary; Bulgaria; Ottoman Empire	Romania; Russian Empire (until 1917); Russian Republic (1917); Serbia; Supported by: France

Commanders and leaders
(German Empire) Erich von Falkenhayn (German Empire) August von Mackensen (German Empire) Johannes von Eben (Austria-Hungary) Archduke Karl (Austria-Hungary) A. A. von Straußenburg (Austria-Hungary) Franz Rohr von Denta (Tsardom of Bulgaria (1908–1946)) Stefan Toshev (Ottoman Empire) Mustafa Hilmi Pasha	(Kingdom of Romania) Ferdinand I (Kingdom of Romania) Constantin Prezan (Kingdom of Romania) Alexandru Averescu (Kingdom of Romania) Eremia Grigorescu (Kingdom of Romania) Ioan Culcer (Kingdom of Romania) Mihail Aslan; Vladimir Sakharov; Dmitry Shcherbachev; Andrei Zayonchkovski (Kingdom of Serbia) Milenko Milićević (French Third Republic) Henri Berthelot

Units involved
(German Empire) 9th Army (German Empire) Danube Army (Austria-Hungary) 1st Army (Tsardom of Bulgaria (1908–1946)) 3rd Army (Ottoman Empire) VI Corps (Austria-Hungary) Danube Flotilla (German Empire) Constantinople Flotilla	(Russian Empire) Romanian Front: 4th Army; Danube/6th Army; 9th Army; (Kingdom of Romania) 2nd Army; (Kingdom of Romania) 1st Army; 8th Army; (Kingdom of Romania) 4th Army (Kingdom of Romania) 3rd Army; Dobruja Army (Kingdom of Serbia) 1st Serbian Division (French Third Republic) French Mission (Kingdom of Romania) Romanian Navy

Strength
(German Empire) (Austria-Hungary) 750,000 (Tsardom of Bulgaria (1908–1946)) 143,049 (1916) (Ottoman Empire) 20,000 (1916) (Ottoman Empire) 39,000 (1917)	1916: (Kingdom of Romania) 658,088 (Russian Empire) 30,000 (Kingdom of Serbia) 20,000 (French Third Republic) 1,600; 1917: (Kingdom of Romania) 400,000 (Russian Empire) 1,000,000: Romanian Corps: 1,000+

Casualties and losses
(German Empire) 191,000 (Austria-Hungary) 96,600 (Tsardom of Bulgaria (1908–1946)) 30,250+ (Ottoman Empire) 20,000 (Austria-Hungary) 1 river monitor sunk 1 river monitor disabled (German Empire) 1 submarine sunk 1 aircraft destroyed Total: 338,000 casualties	(Kingdom of Romania) 535,700; 335,706 dead 120,000 wounded 80,000 captured (Russian Empire) 50,000: Romanian Corps: 500; (Kingdom of Serbia) 9,000; 3,000 dead 6,000 wounded (Kingdom of Romania) 2 torpedo boats sunk 1 gunboat sunk Total: 595,000 casualties
- 330,000–430,000 Romanian civilians dead from war-related causes between 1914 and 1918

The Kingdom of Romania remained neutral throughout the first two years of World War I. They eventually entered the conflict on the side of the Entente from 27 August 1916 until insurmountable pressure from the Central Powers - which had occupied two thirds of the country - led to an armistice being signed on 9 December 1917. Six months later, a crippling peace treaty was imposed on Romania, which the government ratified. King Ferdinand I refused to promulgate the treaty, hoping for an Allied victory on the Western Front. As the Central Power war efforts collapsed, Romania re-entered the war on 10 November 1918.

Romania was still a burgeoning state with great territorial ambitions at the onset of the war. It had achieved its independence following the Russo-Turkish War of 1877–1878, although millions of ethnic Romanians continued to reside outside the new nation's borders, particularly in Transylvania and Bessarabia, which were part of Austria-Hungary and Russia respectively. The Romanian monarchy, which was formed by members of the Hohenzollern dynasty, who were of Germanic origin, was sympathetic towards the cause of the Central Powers. The nation's political elite and the majority of the public favoured the Entente, as joining them would allow Romania to take Transylvania from Austria-Hungary, a region rich with natural resources and inhabited by a Romanian majority. Because of this social division and the general feeling that Romania still was not fully prepared for a war against a great power, the Romanians initially opted for neutrality.

At the outbreak of hostilities, the Austro-Hungarian Empire invoked a casus foederis on Romania and Italy linked to the secret treaty of alliance since 1883. However, both Italy and Romania refused to honor the treaty on the grounds that it was not a case of casus foederis because the attacks on Austria were not "unprovoked", as stipulated in the treaty of alliance. In August 1916, Romania received an ultimatum to decide whether to join the Entente "now or never". Under the pressure of the ultimatum, the Romanian government agreed to enter the war on the side of the Entente, although the situation on the battle fronts was not favorable.

The Romanian campaign was part of the Eastern Front of World War I, with Romania and Russia allied with Britain and France against the Central Powers of Germany, Austria-Hungary, the Ottoman Empire, and Bulgaria. Fighting took place from August 1916 to December 1917 across most of present-day Romania, including Transylvania, which was part of the Austro-Hungarian Empire at the time, as well as in Southern Dobruja, which is currently part of Bulgaria.

The Romanian campaign plan (Hypothesis Z) consisted in attacking Austria-Hungary in Transylvania, while defending Southern Dobruja and Giurgiu from Bulgaria in the south. Despite initial successes in Transylvania, after German divisions started aiding Austria-Hungary and Bulgaria, the Romanian forces (aided by Russia) suffered massive setbacks, and by the end of 1916 out of the territory of the Romanian Old Kingdom only Western Moldavia remained under the control of the Romanian and Russian armies.

After several defensive victories in 1917 at Mărăști, Mărășești, and Oituz, with Russia's withdrawal from the war following the October Revolution, Romania, almost completely surrounded by the Central Powers, was also forced to drop out of the war. It signed the Treaty of Bucharest with the Central Powers in May 1918. Under the terms of the treaty, Romania would lose all of Dobruja to Bulgaria, all the Carpathian passes to Austria-Hungary and would lease all of its oil reserves to Germany for 99 years. However, the Central Powers recognized Romania's union with Bessarabia who had recently declared independence from the Russian Empire following the October Revolution and voted for union with Romania in April 1918. The parliament signed the treaty, but King Ferdinand refused to sign it, hoping for an Allied victory on the western front. In October 1918, Romania renounced the Treaty of Bucharest and on 10 November 1918, one day before the German armistice, Romania re-entered the war after the successful Allied advances on the Macedonian front and advanced in Transylvania. The next day, the Treaty of Bucharest was nullified by the terms of the Armistice of Compiègne.

== Before the war ==
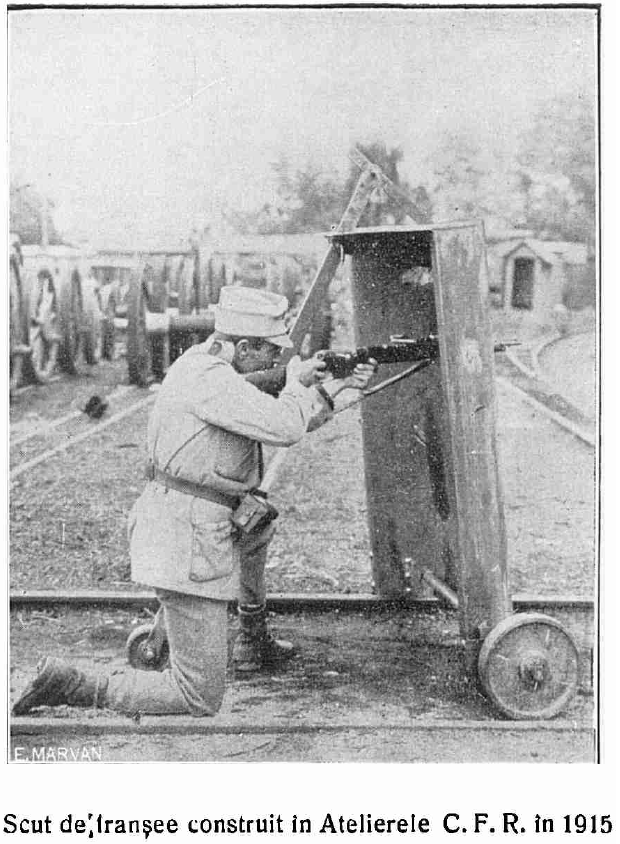
Gun mantlet built at Atelierele CFR

The Kingdom of Romania was ruled by kings of the House of Hohenzollern from 1866. In 1883, the King of Romania, Carol I of Hohenzollern, signed a secret treaty with the Triple Alliance that stipulated Romania's obligation to go to war only if Austria-Hungary was attacked. While Carol wanted to enter World War I as an ally of the Central Powers, the Romanian public and the political parties were in favor of joining the Triple Entente.

Romania remained neutral when the war started, arguing that Austria-Hungary itself had started the war and, consequently, Romania was under no formal obligation to join it. At the same time, Germany started encouraging Austria-Hungary to make territorial concessions to Romania and Italy in order to keep both states neutral.

In return for entering the war on Allied side, Romania demanded support for its territorial claims to parts of Hungarian Transylvania, and especially those parts with a Romanian-speaking majority. The Romanians' greatest concerns in negotiations were the avoidance of a conflict that would have to be fought on two fronts (one in Dobruja with Bulgaria and one in Transylvania) and written guarantees of Romanian territorial gains after the war. They demanded an agreement not to make a separate peace with the Central Powers, equal status at the future peace conference, Russian military assistance against Bulgaria, an Allied offensive in the direction of Bulgaria, and the regular shipment of Allied war supplies. The military convention they signed with the Allies stipulated that France and Britain should start an offensive against Bulgaria and the Ottoman Empire no later than August 1916, that Russia would send troops into Dobruja, and that the Romanian army would not be subordinated to Russian command. The Allies were to send 300 tons of provisions on a daily basis. According to the Romanian account, most of these clauses, with the exception of those imposed on Romania, failed to be respected.

The Allies accepted the terms late in the summer of 1916 (see Treaty of Bucharest, 1916); Cyril Falls attributes the late decision to Romania's historical hostility towards the Russian Empire and purports that an earlier entry into the war, perhaps before the Brusilov offensive the same year, would have provided better chance for victory. According to some American military historians, Russia delayed approval of Romanian demands out of worries about Romanian territorial designs on Bessarabia, claimed by nationalist circles as a Romanian land. According to British military historian John Keegan, before Romania entered the war, the Allies had secretly agreed not to honour the territorial expansion of Romania when the war ended.

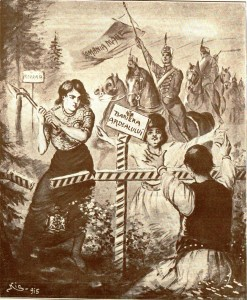
Sketch pleading for the entry of Romania into war against Austria-Hungary in order to create Greater Romania (Ilustraţiunea magazine, November 1915)

In 1915, Lieutenant-Colonel Christopher Thomson, a fluent speaker of French, was sent to Bucharest as British military attaché on the initiative of Lord Kitchener to bring Romania into the war. Once there, he quickly formed the view that an unprepared and ill-armed Romania facing a war on two fronts would be a liability, not an asset, to the Allies. This view was brushed aside by Whitehall, and Thomson signed a Military Convention with Romania on 13 August 1916. Within a few months, he had to alleviate the consequences of Romania's setbacks and supervise the destruction of the Romanian oil wells to deny them to Germany.

The Romanian government signed a treaty with the Allies (France, Britain, Italy, and Russia) on 17 August 1916 that pledged to declare war on Austria-Hungary by 28 August. The Romanian ambassador in Vienna actually transmitted the declaration of war on 27 August. Germany, caught by surprise, responded with a declaration of war on Romania the next day (28 August). The dates of the Bulgarian and Ottoman declarations of war are disputed. Ian Beckett says that Bulgaria did not issue a declaration of war prior to its attack of 31 August. Other sources place the declaration on 30 August or 1 September. The Ottoman declaration took place either on 29 August, 30 August or 1 September. Within two days of her own declaration, according to one source, Romania found herself at war with all the Central Powers.

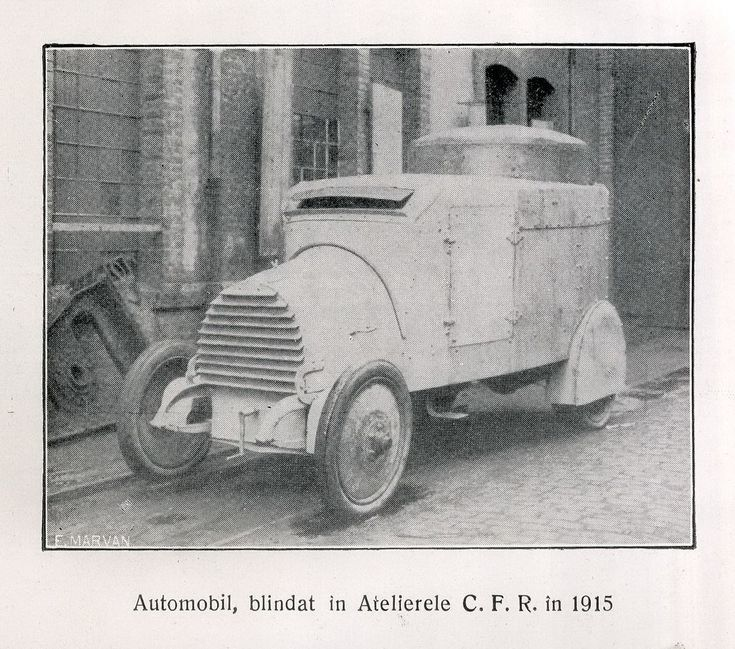
Armored car built at Atelierele CFR

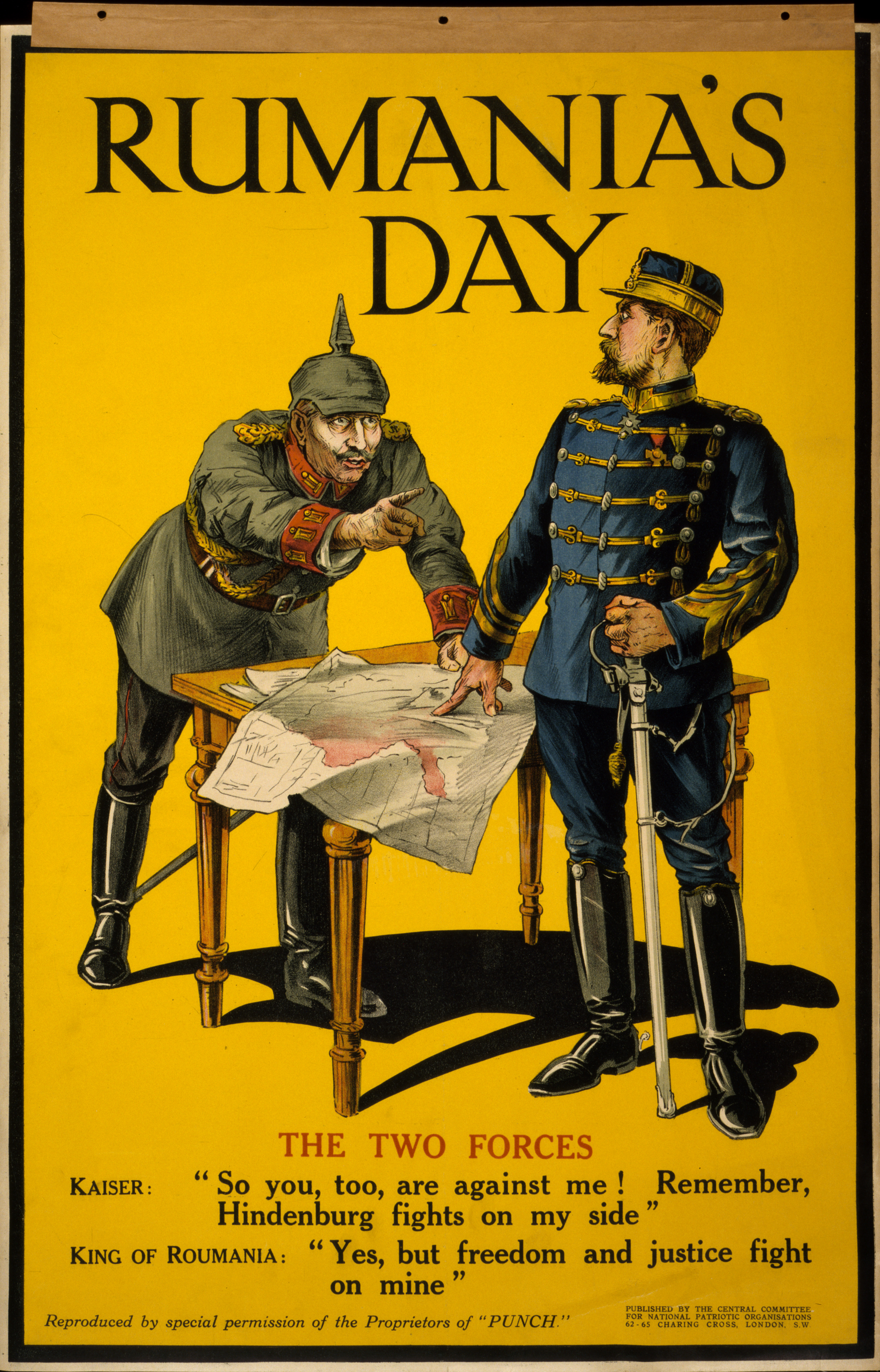
British poster, welcoming Romania's decision to join the Entente

The Romanian Army was quite large, with over 650,000 men in 23 divisions, but it suffered from poor training and equipment, particularly when compared to its German counterparts. Meanwhile, the German Chief of Staff, General Erich von Falkenhayn, had correctly reasoned that Romania would side with the Allies, and had made plans accordingly. Thanks to the earlier conquest of the Kingdom of Serbia and the ineffective Allied operations on the Greek border (the Salonica campaigns), and having a territorial interest in Dobruja, the Bulgarian Army and the Ottoman Army were willing to help fight the Romanians.

The German high command was seriously worried about the prospect of Romania entering the war, Paul von Hindenburg writing:

It is certain that so relatively small a state as Rumania had never before been given a role so important, and, indeed, so decisive for the history of the world at so favorable a moment. Never before had two great Powers like Germany and Austria found themselves so much at the mercy of the military resources of a country which had scarcely one twentieth of the population of the two great states. Judging by the military situation, it was to be expected that Rumania had only to advance where she wished to decide the world war in favor of those Powers which had been hurling themselves at us in vain for years. Thus everything seemed to depend on whether Rumania was ready to make any sort of use of her momentary advantage.

=== Romanian armaments industry ===
Between 1914 and 1916, 59 Romanian factories produced 400,000 artillery rounds, 70 million bullets, 1,500 caissons, and 332 gun carriages. Grenades were also manufactured, with three factories producing 1.5 tons of explosives daily. The 332 gun carriages were produced in order to convert Romania's 53 mm and 57 mm Fahrpanzer fortress guns into field artillery. Some of the 57 mm guns were converted into anti-aircraft guns using a carriage designed by the Romanian General Ștefan Burileanu. The Romanian army badly lacked arms and ammunitions during the war, due to the industrial underdevelopment of the country.

== Romanians in the Austro-Hungarian Army ==
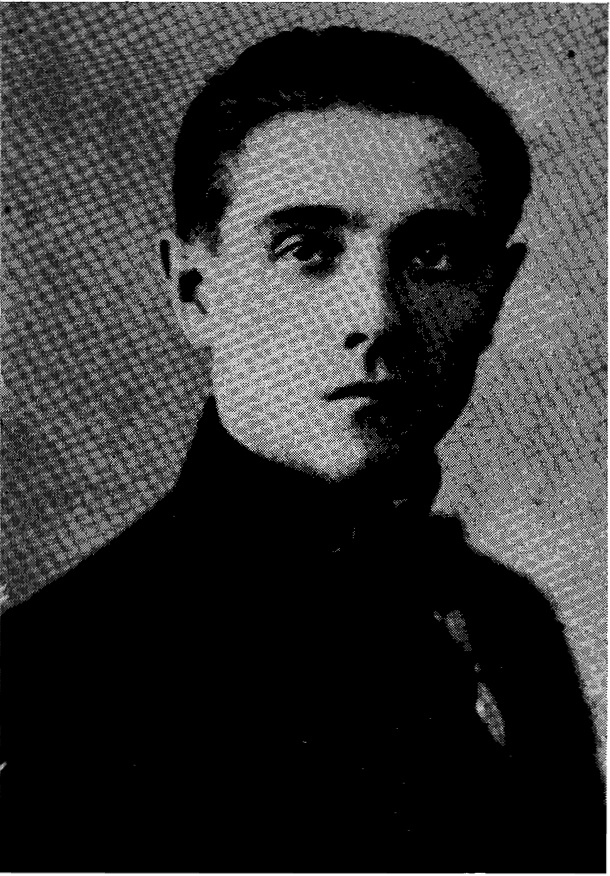
Leutnant Emil Rebreanu was awarded the Medal for Bravery in gold

Ethnic Romanians in Austria-Hungary participated in the war from the very beginning. Approximately 16% of the pre-war Austro-Hungarian population were ethnic Romanians. Between 1914 and 1918, an estimated 400,000 to 600,000 ethnic Romanians served with the Austro-Hungarian Army.

Romanian troops fought on all European fronts of the Dual Monarchy, some of them being distinguished, such as Feldmarschall-leutnant (Lieutenant field marshal) Ioan Boeriu, Oberst (Colonel) Dănilă Papp, Hauptmann (Captain) Gheorghe Flondor and Leutnant (Lieutenant) Emil Rebreanu. Other notable Romanians who fought in the Austro-Hungarian Army included Oberleutnant (First lieutenant) and Imperial Adviser Constantin Isopescu-Grecul, as well as Octavian Codru Tăslăuanu, who also wrote valuable memoirs about his war experience. Samoilă Mârza, a private in the Austro-Hungarian Army, reached as far as Riga and became the first Romanian war photographer. In total, up to 150,000 Romanians were killed in action while fighting as part of the Austro-Hungarian Army.

Although most ethnic Romanians were loyal to the Empire, over time their loyalty faded as the war progressed, especially after Romania joined the war. According to studies made by the Army, the loyalty of Romanian soldiers declined severely. Only ethnic Italians ranked lower. Also, in the first three years of fighting, out of about 300,000 Austro-Hungarian deserters, 150,000 were ethnic Romanians. Desertion to the enemy increased significantly in the last two years of the war, greatly weakening Austro-Hungarian forces. This sometimes resulted in collapse of entire sections of the front.

Ethnic Romanian Austro-Hungarian prisoners of war held by the Russian Empire formed the Romanian Volunteer Corps in Russia. Allied aircraft dropped leaflets on Austro-Hungarian positions held by ethnic Romanians about the Volunteer Corps and the Darnița Declaration. This force was repatriated to Romania in 1917. Many fought in the battles of Mărăști, Mărășești, and Oituz, where with Russian support the Romanian army defeated an offensive by the Central Powers and even regained some territory. (Note: Former prisoners also set up the Romanian Legion which served with the White movement in Siberia during the Russian Civil War.)

Many novels have been written on this subject, including Liviu Rebreanu's Forest of the Hanged.

=== The Legion of Romanian Volunteers in Italy ===
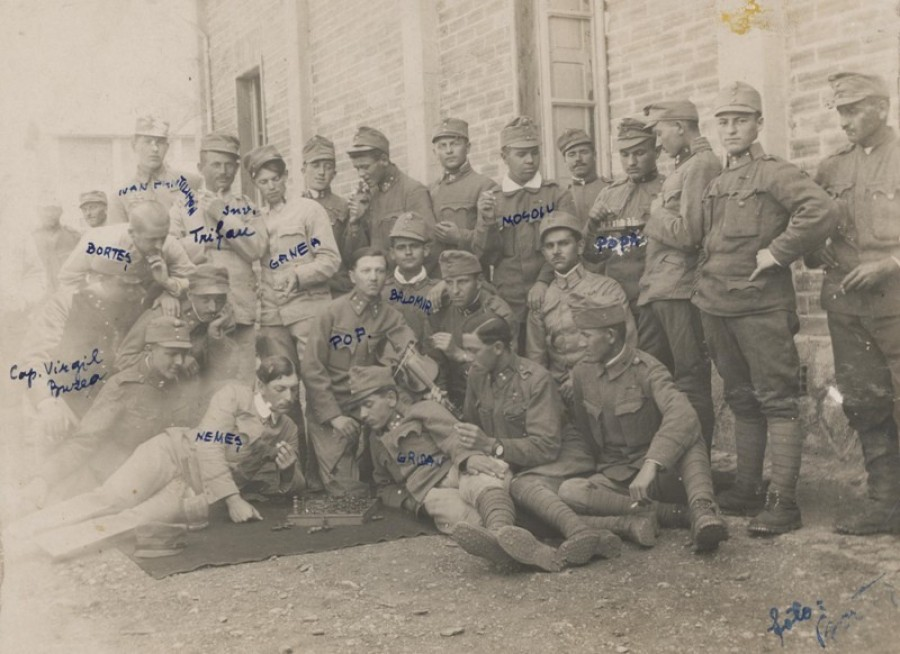
The Romanian Legion in Italy

Although the first Romanian Transylvanian prisoners in Italy were documented as early as June 1915, it was not until 1916 that the percentage of Romanian prisoners of war from Austro-Hungarian troops became significant, and they were mainly concentrated in northern Italy. Along with prisoners of other nationalities of Austria-Hungary, scattered throughout Italy, they contributed to a better understanding of the ethnic situation of the Austro-Hungarian Empire.

Particularly in the province of L'Aquila, where a strong earthquake destroyed the roads and civil structures on January 13, 1915, the need for manpower led to the establishment in Avezzano of a camp with 15,000 prisoners. Over time, the component represented by prisoners of Romanian origin has increased significantly, who have developed a good reputation and a good image among the civilian Italian population. The ease with which Italian citizens were able to communicate with the Romanians in relation to Germans and Hungarians, as well as their spirit of sacrifice associated with the demonstration of being good workers, led to the respect of the Italian civilians towards Romanians. This went to the point where Italian civil solidarity and assistance committees were spontaneously created, reserved for Romanian citizens and their families left in the homeland.

Diplomatic and political efforts to establish the Legion started in early July 1916. These efforts gained notable consistency in Italy after the "Congress of the Oppressed Nations in Austria-Hungary" was held in April 1918 in Rome, at a time when Italy became interested in further efforts to hasten the disintegration of the Austro-Hungarian state.

Following requests for enlistment to fight against Austria-Hungary, the Romanian volunteers were incorporated in July 1918 into the Italian Royal Army, to be enlisted in October of the same year in a large national unit. Between July and October 1918, three companies were formed, named "Horea", "Cloșca" and "Crișan". The education given to the volunteers enrolled in the new units, emphasized the development of the Romanian national consciousness and the love for their country, which was to be Romania, a country that many knew only through the hostile propaganda of Austria-Hungary. Also, this education aimed to eliminate the distrust in the new Italian ally, as well as the difficulties of communication with other soldiers from the other Romanian historical regions. The only language used in military service was Romanian. Officers of Romanian origin had a complex training program, which included, among other things, the study of the Italian language. The equipment and endowment of the constituted units and subunits was made with Italian military equipment. The enlisted POWs received the corresponding rank in the Italian Royal Army. The sedentary part of the Romanian Legion, under the command of Colonel Camillo Ferraioli, was established at Albano Laziale, and the base camp in the Avezzano camp. Out of a total of 60,000 prisoners of war of Romanian origin, 36,712 soldiers and 525 officers requested to join the Romanian Legion in Italy (Legione Romena d'Italia). Of the officers, one was a colonel, 5 were majors, 32 captains, 97 lieutenants, 294 sublieutenants, and 96 applicants.

Only the three companies formed prior to October 1918 actually fought on the Italian front until the armistice of November 3, 1918. Taking part in the battles of Vittorio Veneto, Montello, Sisemolet, Piave, Cimone and Monte Grappa. After the end of the war, they participated in the Hungarian–Romanian War.

== Course of the Romanian campaign ==
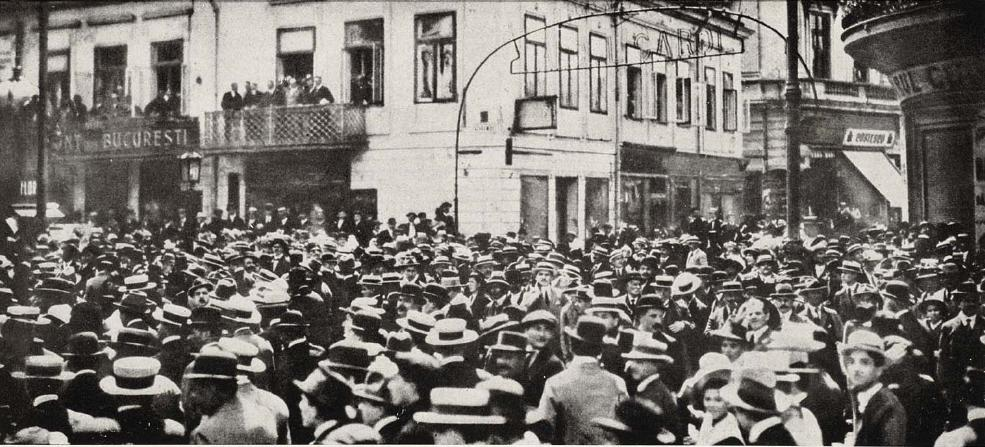
A demonstration in favour of Romania's entry in WWI on the Entente side, Bucharest

Romanians!

The war which for the last two years has been encircling our frontiers more and more closely has shaken the ancient foundations of Europe to their depths.

It has brought the day which has been awaited for centuries by the national conscience, by the founders of the Romanian State, by those who united the principalities in the war of independence, by those responsible for the national renaissance.

It is the day of the union of all branches of our nation. Today we are able to complete the task of our forefathers and to establish forever that which Michael the Great was only able to establish for a moment, namely, a Romanian union on both slopes of the Carpathians.

For us the mountains and plains of Bukowina, where Stephen the Great has slept for centuries. In our moral energy and our valour lie the means of giving him back his birthright of a great and free Rumania from the Tisza to the Black Sea, and to prosper in peace in accordance with our customs and our hopes and dreams.

Romanians!

Animated by the holy duty imposed upon us, and determined to bear manfully all the sacrifices inseparable from an arduous war, we will march into battle with the irresistible élan of a people firmly confident in its destiny. The glorious fruits of victory shall be our reward. Forward, with the help of God!

FERDINAND

— Proclamation by King Ferdinand, 28 August 1916

On the night of 27 August 1916, three Romanian armies (First, Second and Northern Army), deployed according to the Romanian campaign plan (Hypothesis Z), launched the Battle of Transylvania through the Carpathians. On that same night, the torpedo boats NMS Rândunica, Bujorescu and Catinca attacked the Austro-Hungarian Danube Flotilla at the Bulgarian port of Ruse, sinking one barge loaded with fuel and damaging the port's quay. Initially, the only opposing force was the Austro-Hungarian First Army, which was steadily pushed back toward Hungary. In a short time, the towns of Brașov, Făgăraș, and Miercurea Ciuc were captured, and the outskirts of Sibiu were reached. In areas populated with Romanians, the Romanian troops were warmly welcomed, and the locals provided them considerable assistance in terms of provisions, billeting and guiding. However, the rapid Romanian advance alarmed the Central Powers, and within weeks sizable reinforcements began arriving at the scene. The Entente incorrectly assumed that Germany would be unable to respond to the invasion, as the Battle of the Somme and the Brusilov Offensive were at their height around this time and tied down significant German forces. Nevertheless, eight divisions and an Alpine Corps were deployed under the command of Erich von Falkenhayn. The Austro-Hungarians also sent four divisions to reinforce their lines, and by the middle of September, the Romanian offensive was halted. A separate Romanian offensive, carried out by the 1st Infantry Division, was much more limited in its aims and it succeeded: capturing the west bank of the Cerna River within the Banat region. The Romanian occupation of the area lasted for over two months, until mid-November.

While the Romanian Army was advancing in Transylvania, the first counterattack came from Field Marshal August von Mackensen in command of a multi-national force composed of the Bulgarian Third Army, a German brigade and two divisions of the Ottoman VI Army Corps, whose units began arriving on the Dobrudja front after the initial battles. This army attacked north from Bulgaria, starting on 1 September. It stayed on the south side of the Danube river and headed towards Constanța. Bulgarian troops (aided by the German-Bulgarian Detachment) surrounded and stormed the fortress of Turtucaia. The Romanian garrison surrendered on 6 September at the conclusion of the Battle of Turtucaia. At the same time, the Bulgarian Third Army with the 75th Turkish regiment, arrived on the last day of the battle, defeated a Romanian-Russian force including the First Serbian Volunteer Division at the Battle of Bazargic, despite the almost double superiority of the Entente. The Romanian Third Army made further attempts to withstand the enemy offensive at Silistra, Dobrich, Amzacea, and Topraisar, but had to withdraw under the pressure of the enemy forces. Mackensen's success was favoured by the failure of the Allies to fulfill the obligation they had assumed through the military convention, by virtue of which they had to mount an offensive on the Macedonian front and the conditions in which the Russians deployed insufficient troops on the battlefront in the south-east of Romania. These factors meant that the Romanian forces became too strained to put up effective resistance against the enemy advance. Romania had to fight on two 1,600 km-long battlefronts, the longest front in Europe, with a varied configuration and diverse geographical elements (by comparison, the Russian front, stretching from the Baltic Sea to Bukovina, was only 1,000 km long).

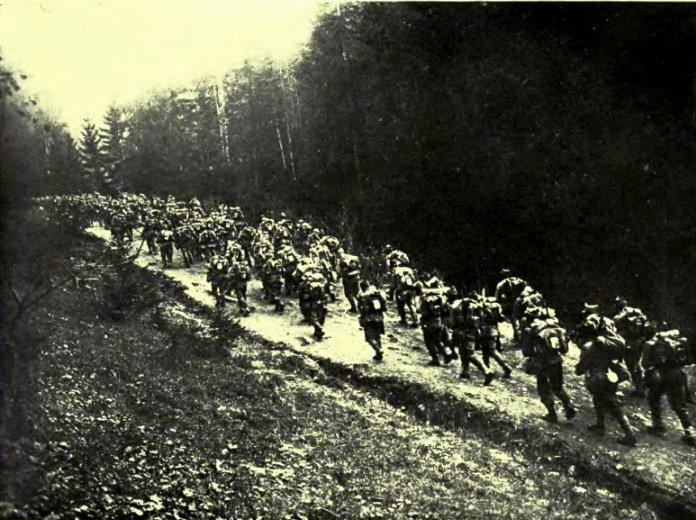
Romanian troops in Transylvania, 1916

On 15 September the Romanian War Council decided to suspend the Transylvania offensive and concentrate on the Mackensen army group instead. The plan (the so-called Flămânda Offensive) was to attack the Central Powers forces from the rear by crossing the Danube at Flămânda, while the front-line Romanian and Russian forces were supposed to launch an offensive southwards towards Cobadin and Kurtbunar. Russian reinforcements under General Andrei Zaionchkovsky arrived to halt Mackensen's army before it cut the rail line that linked Constanța with Bucharest. Fighting was furious, with attacks and counterattacks until 23 September. The Central Powers suffered a tactical defeat in the First Battle of Cobadin on 19 September, forcing them to halt their advance until mid-October. On 30 September, near the Romanian port of Sulina, the German submarine UB-42 launched a torpedo at the Romanian torpedo boat NMS Smeul, but missed. The Romanian warship counterattacked, damaging the submarine's periscope and conning tower and forcing her to retreat. On 1 October, two Romanian divisions crossed the Danube at Flămânda and created a bridgehead 14 kilometer-wide and 4 kilometer-deep. On the next day, this area was expanded, with 8 Bulgarian settlements ending up in Romanian hands. However, due to the deteriorating situation in Transylvania, the offensive was cancelled on 3 October. The Austro-Hungarian river monitors Bodrog, Körös and Szamos, together with the patrol boat Barsch and one coal barge were damaged by Romanian coastal batteries and one large barge loaded with explosives was sunk. Körös took 12 hits and was disabled for the rest of the Romanian Campaign.

=== The counteroffensive of the Central Powers ===
Overall command was now under Erich von Falkenhayn (recently replaced as German Chief of Staff), who started his own counterattack on 18 September. The first attack was on the Romanian First Army near the town of Hațeg; the attack halted the Romanian advance. Eight days later, German troops attacked Sibiu, and on 29 September, the outnumbered Romanians began retreating to the Vulcan and Turnu Roșu passes. The latter, however, had been occupied by Bavarian mountain troops in a flanking movement, and the Battle of Turnu Roșu Pass ended with the Romanians retaking the pass at a cost of 3,000 men. On 17 October the Romanian Second Army attacked the Austro-Hungarians at Brașov, but the attack was repulsed and the counterattack forced the Romanians to retreat from there also. The Romanian Fourth Army, in the north of the country, retreated without much pressure from the Austro-Hungarian troops, so that by 25 October the Romanian army was back to its initial positions. The Central Powers succeeded in taking the strategic initiative in Transylvania by concentrating significant military forces rapidly brought in from the other theatres of operations in Europe and exploiting a quick shift of Romanian units to the battlefront in Dobruja.

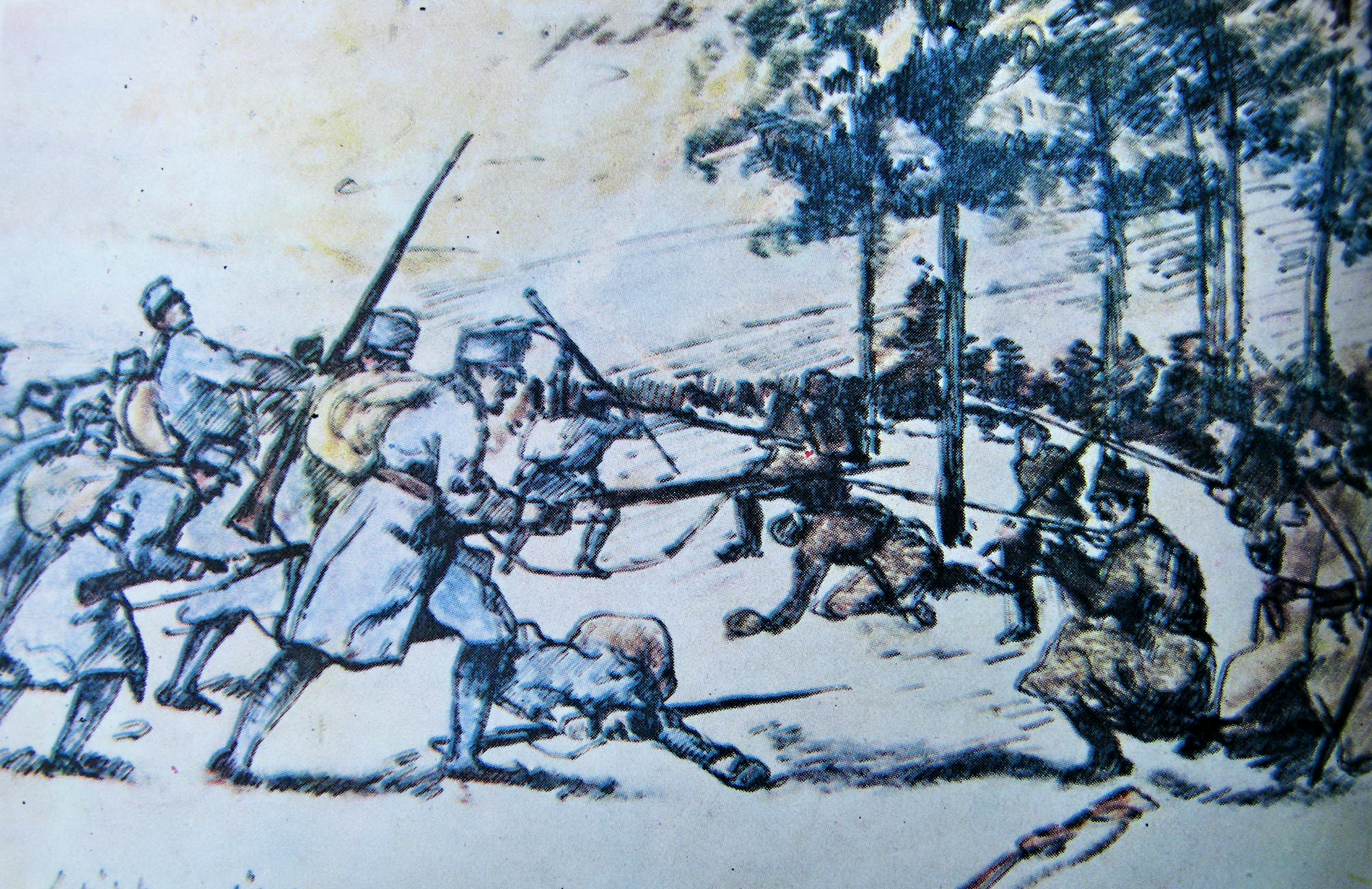
Romanian troops repelling an Austro-Hungarian attack, October 1916

In October 1916, the Romanian army mounted a wide-scale operation, the main target of which was the defense of the mountain passes in the Southern and Eastern Carpathians against the ever-stronger pressure of the German and Austro-Hungarian forces. Grim fights erupted in the Prahova Valley, where occupation of the locality of Predeal was one of the major aims pursued by the Central Powers. Given their dramatic character, the clashes for the Predeal town and railway station were frequently compared with the heaviest fights on the Western Front. Similar fights took place in the Bran-Câmpulung area, especially at Dragoslavele and Racoș.

Particular heed was paid to the actions carried on for the defense of the Carpathians' alignment, the fights on the Jiu River. There, the Germans had massed large forces to beat their way south of the mountains. Faced with the enemy threat, the troops of the Romanian First Army, under command of General Ion Dragalina, offered strong resistance. The Romanian soldiers were supported everywhere by the civil population; during the Battle of Târgu Jiu, the town was defended by its inhabitants, men, women and children, young and old. There, a conspicuous figure was cut by Ecaterina Teodoroiu, who was to enter the consciousness of all Romanians as the "Heroine of the Jiu". The operation for the defense of the Carpathians holds a prominent place in Romanian military history not only because it was one of the most difficult operations waged by the Romanian army until then, but also because it was one of the most important as regards the complexity of the actions carried on and the highly valuable lessons derived from their evolution.

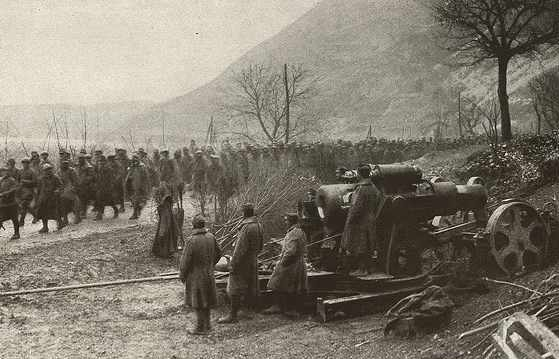
Romanian prisoners of war passing by an Austro-Hungarian howitzer at the Turnu Roșu Pass

After the Romanian troops were initially able to stop the German advance on the Jiu Valley, the German army regrouped on 29 October 1916. The German High Command created the Army Group Kühne, headquartered in Petroșani, under the command of General Viktor Kühne. This Army Group included the 11th and 301st Bavarian infantry divisions, which had previously fought the Romanians on the Jiu, the 41st Prussian and the 109th infantry divisions which were transferred from the Riga front, as well as the newly formed 58th Cavalry Corps (z.b.V) under the command of General Egon von Schmettow, which included the 6th and 7th cavalry divisions. The German reserves consisted of the 115th infantry division and two brigades of cyclists. The total manpower of the Army Group amounted to 80,000 troops with 30,000 horses. The Romanian forces could not withstand the new German attack which started on 1 November 1916. The Romanians retreated and on 21 November 1916 the German cavalry entered Craiova. The Romanian army continued its retreat towards the Olt River while the cavalry tried to slow the German advance in order to give it time to organize a defensive line along the Olt. Although the Romanian army made attempts to stop the advance of the German forces, such as in the Battle of Robănești, these were largely unsuccessful.

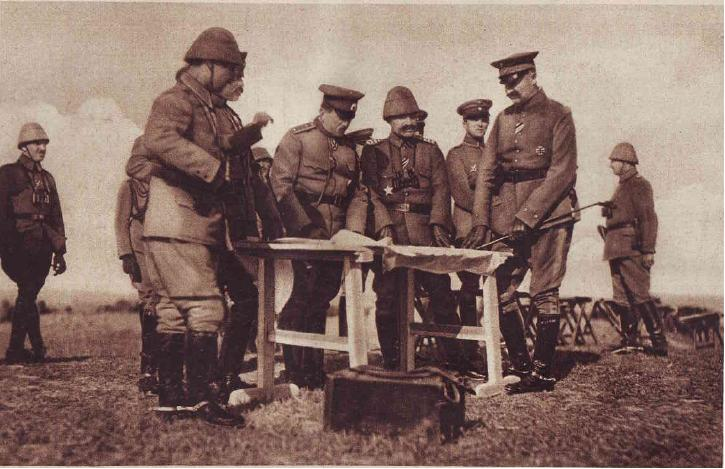
General Stefan Toshev and General Hilmi Paşa with Bulgarian and Ottoman officers observing the fighting around Medgidia

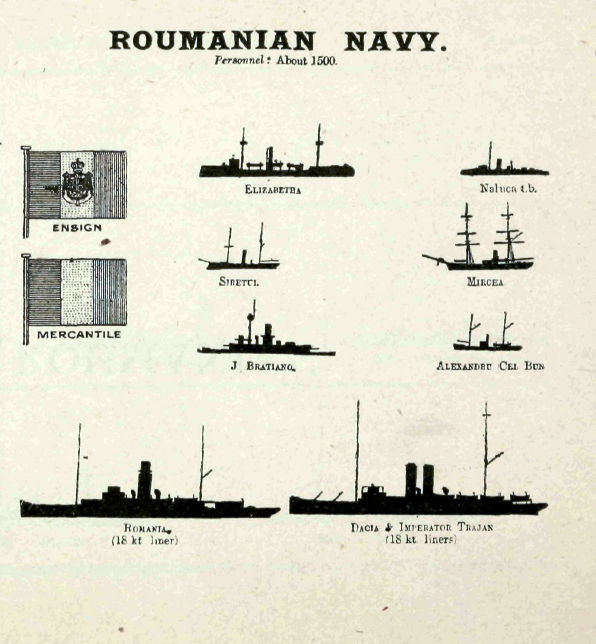
Romanian Navy main warships: NMS Elisabeta cruiser, Năluca-class torpedo boats (three), Siretul-class gunboats (four), training ship Mircea, Brătianu-class river monitors (four), Alexandru cel Bun minelayer and armed liners

Back on the coast, Field Marshal Mackensen and Bulgarian General Stefan Toshev launched a new offensive on 19 October, after a month of careful preparations, and achieved a decisive victory in the Second Battle of Cobadin. The Romanians and Russians were forced to withdraw out of Constanța (occupied by the Central Powers on 22 October). After the fall of Cernavodă, the defense of the unoccupied Dobruja was left only to the Russians, who were gradually pushed back towards the marshy Danube Delta. The Russian Army was now both demoralized and nearly out of supplies. Mackensen felt free to secretly pull a large number of troops back to the town of Svishtov in Bulgaria with an eye towards crossing the Danube river.

In mid-November, after several tactical defeats in the Southern Carpathians (Bran-Câmpulung, Prahova Valley, Jiu Valley), Falkenhayn concentrated his best troops (the elite Alpenkorps) in the south for an attack on the Vulcan Pass. The Second Battle of the Jiu Valley was launched on 10 November. One of the young officers was the future Field Marshal Erwin Rommel. On 11 November, then-Lieutenant Rommel led the Württemberg Mountain Company in the capture of Mount Lescului. The offensive pushed the Romanian defenders back through the mountains and into the plains by 26 November. There was already snow covering the mountains and soon operations would have to halt for the winter. Advances by other parts of Falkenhayn's Ninth Army also pushed through the mountains; the Romanian army was being ground down by the constant battle and their supply situation was becoming critical.

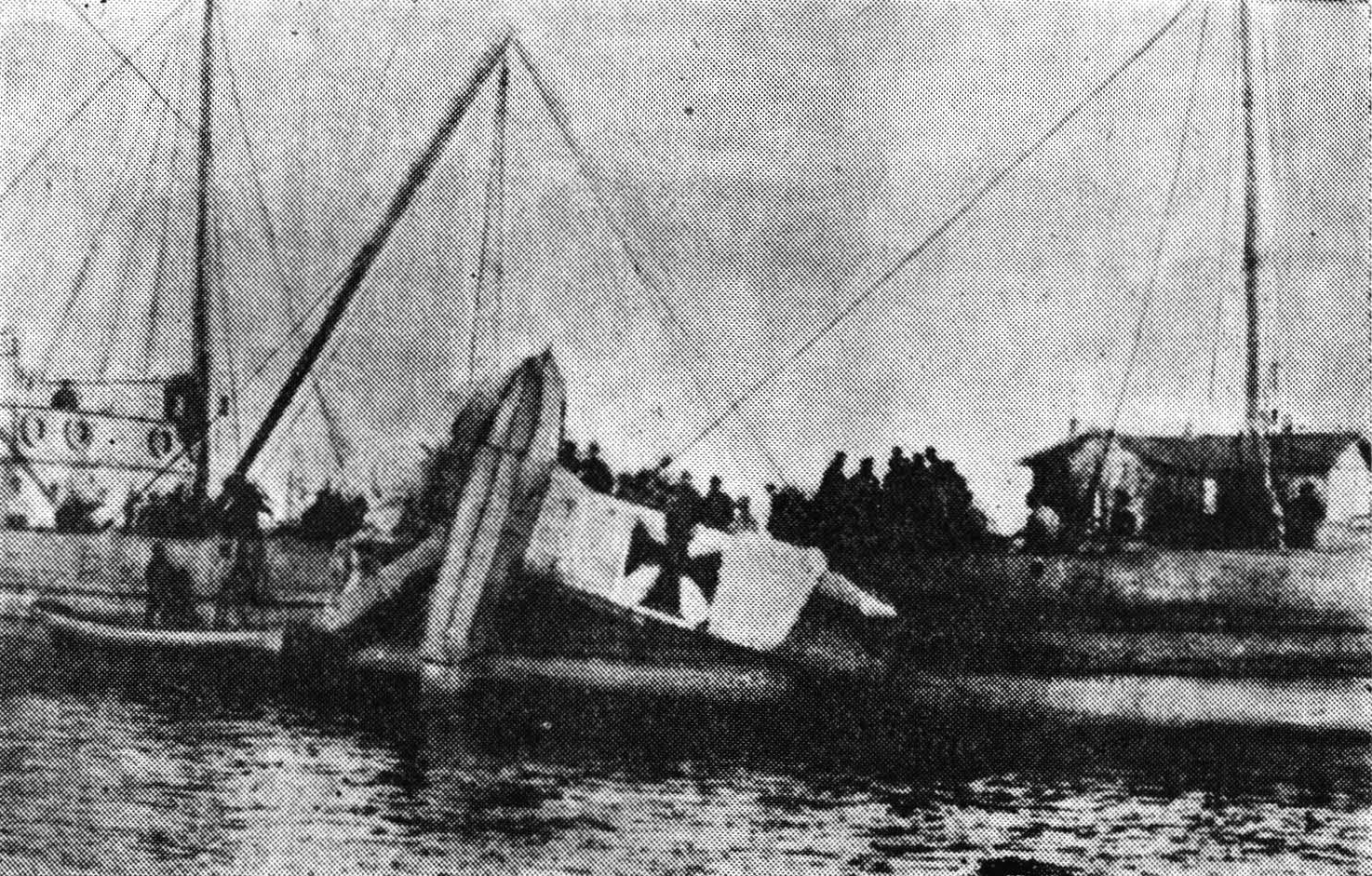
German seaplane shot down at Sulina

After conquering the main Romanian sea port of Constanța during the Second Battle of Cobadin, the Central Powers set up a naval base which was used by German seaplanes for raids against Sulina, the last Romanian-held sea port. On 7 November, Romanian anti-aircraft defenses at Sulina (including the old protected cruiser NMS Elisabeta) shot down into the sea one of the seaplanes, killing the commander of the German squadron. This reduced the German seaplane force at Constanța by a quarter, which only consisted of four aircraft in November 1916. The shot down seaplane was of the Friedrichshafen FF.33 type, as these were the only German naval bombers on the Romanian front. In total, from 1916 to 1918, German seaplanes serving on the Romanian front were of four types: Friedrichshafen FF.33, Hansa-Brandenburg W.12, Rumpler 6B and Albatros W.4. In November, the German submarine UC-15 was sent on a minelaying mission off Sulina and never returned, being sunk by her own mines. This was probably caused by an encounter with the Romanian torpedo boat NMS Smeul, whose captain surprised a German submarine near Sulina in November 1916, the latter reportedly never returning to her base at Varna. This could only be UC-15, whose systems most likely malfunctioned after being forced to submerge in the shallow waters, upon encountering the Romanian torpedo boat. Her flotilla briefly remained without a minelaying submarine, until UC-23 was commissioned in early December.

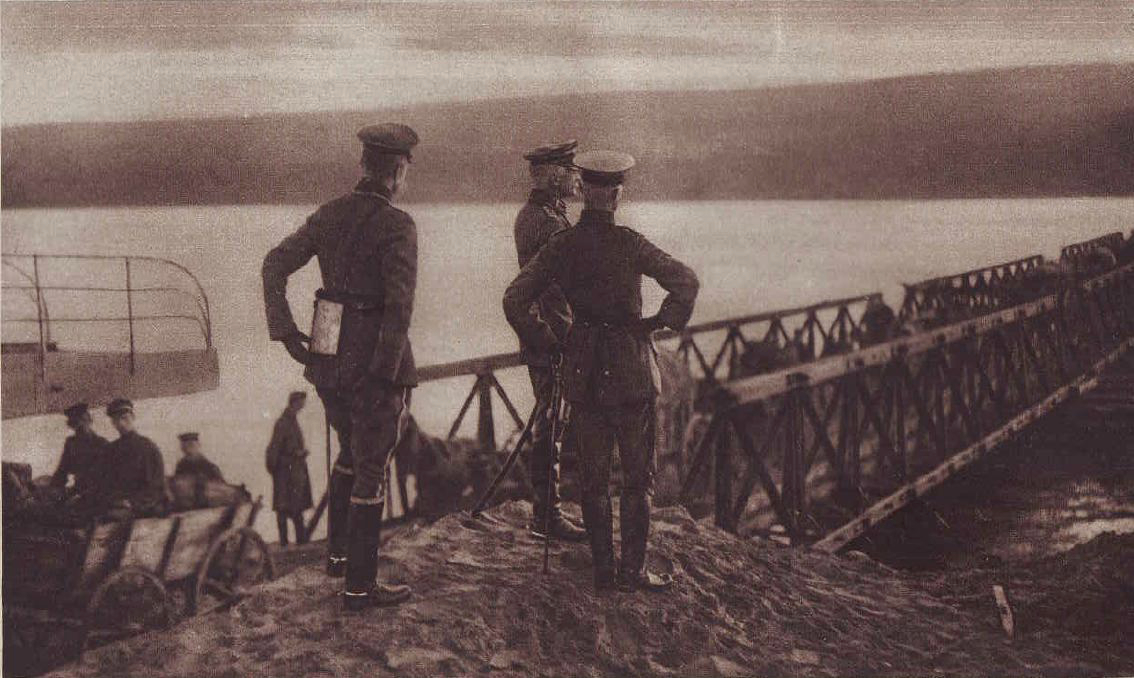
Fieldmarshal von Mackensen leading his forces across the Danube.

==== Battles on the Wallachian Plain ====
On 23 November, Mackensen's best troops crossed the Danube at two locations near Svishtov. This attack caught the Romanians by surprise and Mackensen's army was able to advance rapidly towards Bucharest against very weak resistance. Mackensen's attack threatened to cut off half the Romanian army. In response, the Romanian Command prepared a counter-offensive known under the name of the Battle of the Argeș (part of the Battle of Bucharest) and designated the recently promoted General Constantin Prezan to lead it. The plan envisaged the checking of the advance of the German Ninth Army from the north and north-west, as well as the encirclement and annihilation of the German-Bulgarian-Turkish units deployed south-east of Bucharest. It was a bold undertaking, using the entire reserves of the Romanian army, but it needed the cooperation of Russian divisions to contain Mackensen's offensive while the Romanian reserve struck the gap between Mackensen and Falkenhayn. However, the Russian army would not endorse the plan and did not support the attack.

On 1 December, the Romanian army went ahead with the offensive along the Argeș and Neajlov rivers. Initially, the Romanians experienced success, taking a large number of prisoners, however Mackensen was able to shift forces to deal with the sudden assault and Falkenhayn's forces responded with attacks at every point. Faced with the overwhelming superiority of the invading forces, the Romanian army, its ranks thinned from the previous actions, inferior in equipment and lacking Russian support, failed to check the enemy advance. Although it recorded numerous daring actions (among these the Prunaru Charge, in which the 2nd Roșiori Cavalry Regiment was almost wiped out), the Battle of the Argeș ended unfavourably for the Romanian army. Within three days, the attack had been shattered and the Romanians were retreating everywhere. Bucharest was captured on 6 December by Falkenhayn's cavalry. General August von Mackensen was appointed as the "military governor" of the occupied territories of Romania. The Romanian Second Army made a fighting retreat to the Siret river, which had originally been fortified against the Russians and was facing the wrong direction, but nevertheless would end up proving invaluable, protected as it was by the impassable Danube Delta to the southeast and a flank in the Carpathians in the northwest. Fierce fighting took place in the Battle of Râmnicu Sărat between 22 and 26 December, with Mackensen's forces entering the town on 27 December. Around this time, the Russians began sending numerous reinforcements to Moldavia to prevent an invasion of southern Russia. Southern Romania, including Oltenia, Muntenia, Dobruja, and southern Moldavia, was now in the hands of the Central Powers. While retreating, the Romanians burnt stores of grain and destroyed oil wells to prevent them from being used by the Germans.

On 3 December, the Romanian river torpedo boat Căpitan Valter Mărăcineanu was sunk on the Danube by a mine and one sailor was killed.

The remaining Russo-Romanian forces in Dobruja abandoned Măcin on 4 January 1917 and Brăila on 5 January 1917. Toward the end of the month, extreme frost gave the Bulgarians an opportunity to enter the Danube Delta. On 23 January, they attempted to cross the marshes at Tulcea, but suffered heavy casualties to Romanian defenders on the northern bank and stopped. The Romanian Land Forces, supported by the Danube Division of the Romanian Navy and by the actions of the Romanian cruiser NMS Elisabeta at the mouths of the Danube, managed to prevent the Central Powers from advancing into the Danube Delta, keeping it under Romanian control until the end of the war. Fighting also ceased in the Carpathian passes, also owing to unfavorable weather. Mackensen's troops were able to capture Focșani on 8 January, but an attempt to break the Siret River line on 19 January failed. Thus, the front stabilized and allowed for the Romanian army to be refitted and rebuilt.

Romania entered the war at a time of strong crisis for the Entente, drawing upon itself numerous enemy forces, fighting on a very long battlefront and having to change its initial campaign plan permanently. But in spite of the human, material and military efforts made by the Central Powers throughout this period, they failed to achieve their fundamental political and strategic goal to defeat Romania and knock it out of the war. Despite heavy casualties, some 250,000 men (almost one third of the manpower mobilized in August 1916) compared to 105,000 Central Power casualties (including 60,000 Germans), and losses of combat material, the Romanian army was still a force taken into consideration by allies and enemies alike and capable of offering resistance to further attacks. Part of the population moved to the free territory, together with the Romanian government, royal court and public authorities, which relocated to Iași. Therefore, the Kingdom of Romania continued to exercise the attributes of an independent and sovereign state, allied to the Entente powers.

=== Romanian recovery ===
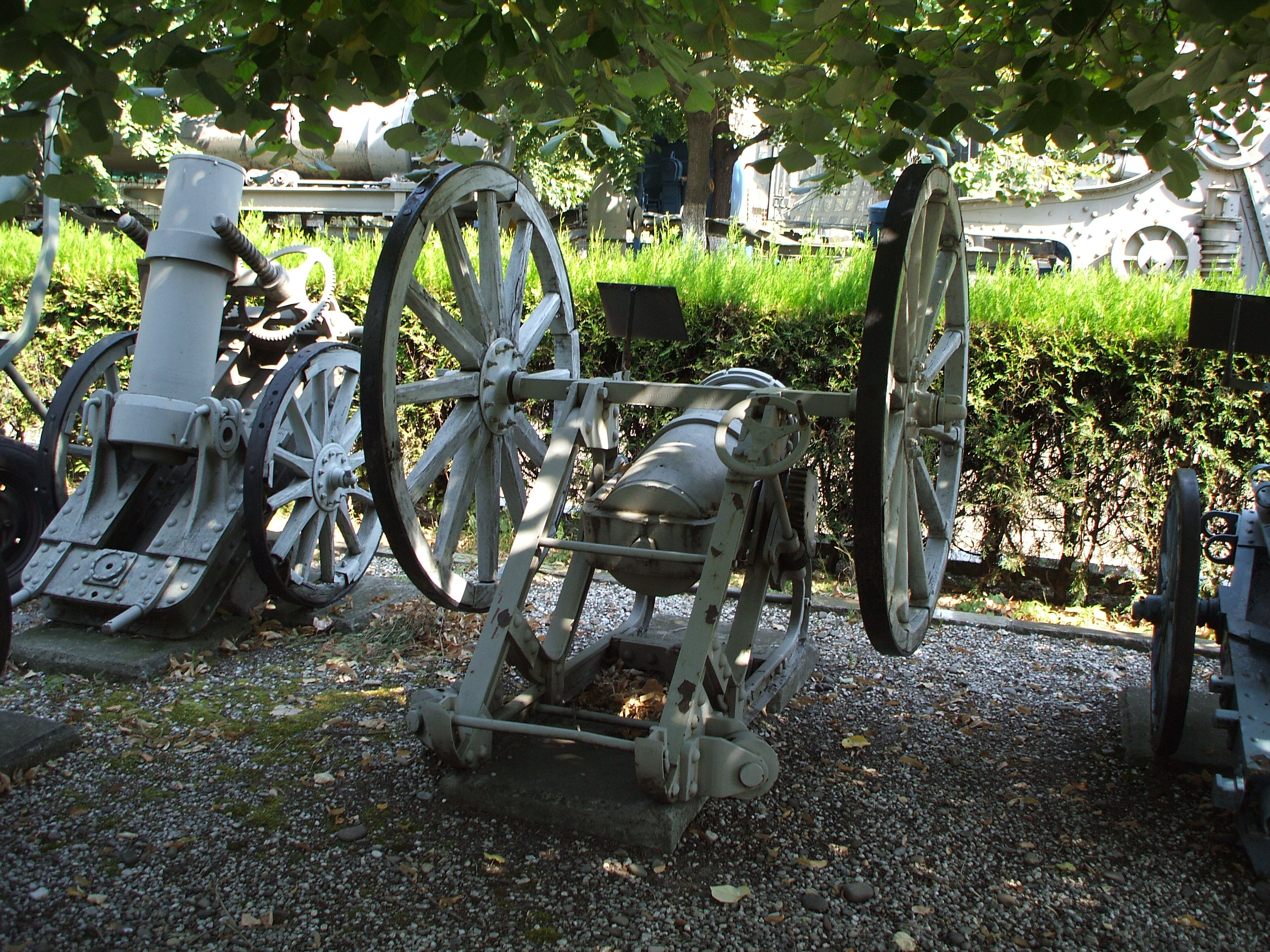
Romanian-made Negrei Model 1916 heavy mortar

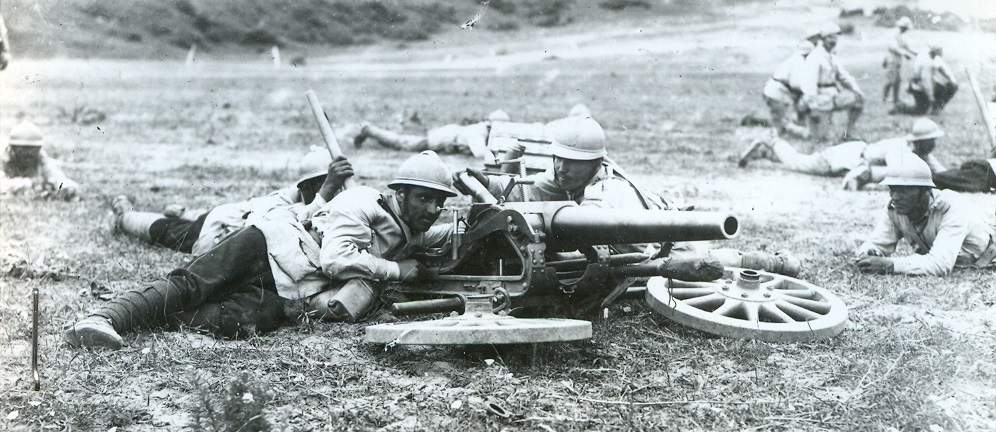
Fahrpanzer 53 mm gun removed from its turret and installed on a Romanian-built gun carriage (thus made an infantry gun)

In 1917, when both belligerent sides were making huge efforts to win the final victory, for Romania it was vitally important for Romanians to expel the occupying forces, since the existence of the Romanian state depended on it. After the Romanian troops had managed to bring the enemy to a halt at Moldavia's Gates, on the Eastern Carpathians, the Siret River and the Danube Delta alignment in cooperation with Russian military forces, Romania embarked on the reconstruction and strengthening of its combat capability during the first half of 1917 through multiple national efforts under highly complex international circumstances. Considerable measures were taken in all economic branches to rebuild the evacuated factories and workshops, increase the production destined for the national defense and the productivity yielded by the exploitation of the few petroleum and coal resources in the free zones. Agriculture received special attention to help meet basic nutritional needs and ensure a minimal living standard to the population in the free part of the country, and also to assist the refugees who had left their houses in front of the enemy invasion, the Romanian army and the Russian troops (who numbered about one million by early 1917).

With a view to achieving the unity of action of internal political forces that was indispensable to safeguarding the nation's interests, a government of national union was set up in Iași on 24 December 1916, led by Ion I. C. Brătianu. The political life in unoccupied territory adopted a fundamental goal to achieve national consensus to find the means to conclude a successful liberation war. Within this framework, debates on some laws envisaging structural transformations (primarily the agrarian reform to re-allocate land to peasants and the introduction of universal suffrage) responded to popular demands of the citizenry and contributed to the morale of the soldiers in the front lines.

The Romanian army's reconstruction involved both re-organization and modernization. While the forces that had taken part in the big Battle of Bucharest (Army Group Prezan) were reshuffled inland, the Romanian Second Army, which had preserved its combat structures and force to a great extent, remained on the front in southern Moldavia, where, alongside Russian forces, it checked the enemy advance. The reorganization was initiated by King Ferdinand and the Romanian government. It was carried on under their leadership and control in the free national territory, in spite of Russian attempts to shift the Romanian army beyond the Dniester, inside Ukraine. The re-organization pursued the reduction of the effectives of the "Operations Army" to parameters that suited the country's resources for waging a long campaign. The infantry divisions were ensured identical structure to make replacements and maneuvers easier on the battlefront and to have a fire power comparable with that of the enemy. The army corps became only a command body for tactical coordination. The cavalry divisions received more machine guns. The artillery material underwent a homogenization process, with two regiments (one cannon, the other howitzer) for each division, while the heavy artillery was organized as a distinct group.

The re-organization also involved the other troops (combat engineers, air force, navy) and services, which underwent notable improvements. The directions, organization and methodology of the training of the command staff and the troops were considerably improved and special training centers were set up. Priority was given to trench warfare, the assimilation of new military technology and night combat.

Considerable progress was achieved with the technical-material equipment of the army by means of its provisioning with armament, ammunition and other combat resources from inside the country, but even more importantly from abroad. The Allies supported the maintenance of the Romanian front by continuing to deliver and supplement previously placed orders. 150,000 French 8 mm rifles, 1,760 Hotchkiss M1914 machine guns, 197 Vickers machine guns, 2,628 Chauchats, 108 Lewis guns, 1.3 million F1 grenades, 84 Puteaux 75mm guns, 72 long and 20 short de Bange 120 mm guns, 28 Coventry 127 mm howitzers, 14 St. Chamond 155 mm and seven Schneider-Putilov 152.4 mm howitzers and 130 French 58mm trench mortars arrived from Western Europe. In parallel, efforts were made to meet the food and health care needs and special heed was paid to strengthening the soldiers' morale. A notable contribution to the reconstruction of the Romanian army was made by the 1,600-strong French military mission led by General Henri Mathias Berthelot, which supervised the process and helped retrain Romanian troops. In early June 1917, the Romanian army's strength grew to about 700,000 men, organized in 207 infantry battalions plus 60 march battalions, 110 cavalry squadrons and 245 artillery batteries, divided among two armies and five corps. The results obtained in terms of re-organization and recovery impressed public opinion both at home and abroad and were to be confirmed in the great battles of the ensuing months.

In January 1917, the Romanian river gunboat Smârdan was sunk by German shore artillery, three sailors were killed. On 16 April, Easter Monday, the Romanian torpedo boat NMS Smeul capsized in rough seas off the mouth of the Danube with the loss of 18 of her crew, including 3 French naval officers present on board. This incident has been incorrectly attributed to Ottoman mines in several English language sources, possibly as a result of wartime propaganda by the Central Powers.

=== 1917 campaign and armistice ===
Aware of the complex strategic situation, the Romanian Command lent its military policy a clear, realistic orientation of committing the entire population to battle, trying to act efficiently in keeping with the national goals and in harmony with the large-scale operations worked out at the coalition level. Its final form ready in late May 1917, the operations plan for the Romanian front called for the mounting of a general offensive in the Focșani-Nămoloasa sector with a view to completely pin down all enemy forces there, annihilate the main enemy groups operating there (the German Ninth Army) and support the Kerensky Offensive. The decisive effort was to be made by the Romanian First Army. In order to increase the effect of the offensive and draw as many enemy troops as possible northwest of the town of Focșani, the actions of the Romanian Second and Russian Fourth Armies had to precede those of the Romanian First Army. The German High Command, which had moved the center of gravity of its military operations to the Eastern Front in hopes of winning a victory there through the defeat of Romania and the conclusion of a peace with Russia, decided in June 1917 to mount a wide-scope offensive in the north and south of Moldavia, to which end it brought over reinforcements from the other fronts.

In early July 1917, on the Romanian front, one of the largest concentrations of combat forces and war material assembled during World War I: nine armies, 80 infantry divisions with 974 battalions, 19 cavalry divisions with 550 squadrons and 923 artillery batteries, whose effectives amounted to some 800,000 men, with about one million in their immediate reserve. The three great battles, decisive for the Romanian nation's destiny, delivered at Mărăști, Mărășești and Oituz, represented a turning point in the war on the Eastern front. These battles were fought approximately on the front alignment stabilized in early 1917, which the conflicting sides had thoroughly consolidated for half a year.

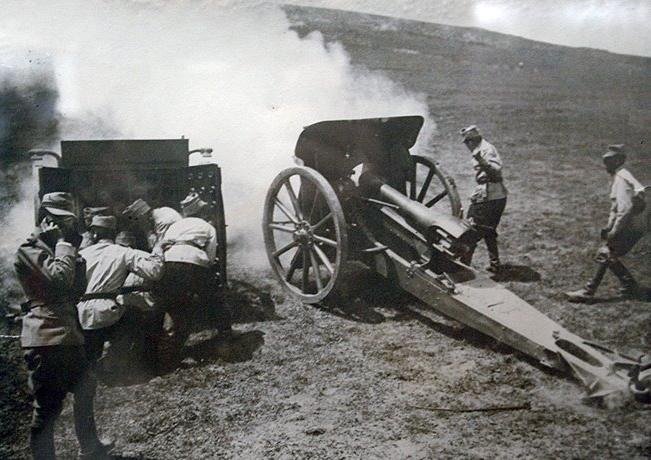
Romanian Model 1912 105 mm howitzer during the Battle of Mărăști

The Battle of Mărăști began on 24 July 1917 at dawn, and took place in Vrancea County in the sector of the Romanian Second and Russian Fourth Armies. Initiated by surprise with three divisions, the offensive succeeded in disrupting the well-organized enemy defenses and compelling the Austro-Hungarians and Germans to retreat. By the evening, the Romanian divisions had conquered the first defenses, the strongest and deepest of the defensive system of the Gerok Group of the Austro-Hungarian First Army in the Mărăști area. The next day, pursuing the offensive, the Romanian troops forced the enemy into an ever more disorderly retreat. This created favorable conditions for a deep penetration into the defensive disposition and the annihilation of the enemy group. However, under the circumstances in which the Russian High Command decided unilaterally to stall any offensive as a result of the grave situation created on the front in Galicia and Bukovina following the failure of the Kerensky Offensive and the counter-attack of the Central Powers, the Romanian General Headquarters saw itself compelled to discontinue the offensive throughout the entire territory between the Eastern Carpathians and the Black Sea. In the Mărăști zone, however, the Romanian units continued the offensive until 30 July upon the request of their commander, General Alexandru Averescu. This marked the end of the Battle of Mărăști. It inflicted important losses upon the Austro-Hungarians and Germans, who relinquished a 35 km-wide and 20 km-deep area and sustained heavy casualties and losses in combat resources. The offensive potential of the Romanian army was confirmed through this victory.

The salient created by the Romanian troops in the enemy lines at the junction between the Austro-Hungarian First Army and the German Ninth Army made the High Command of the Central Powers bring forces from other sectors on the Moldavian front and change the main direction of the offensive initially planned for the Focșani-Nămoloasa region. After the Mărăști operation had been discontinued, the Central Powers tried to implement their offensive plan in the summer of 1917. They pursued to encircle and smash the Romanian and Russian forces through a blow dealt to the northwest in the direction of Focșani, Mărășești and Adjud, conjugated with another blow that had to start from the mountains through the Oituz and Trotuș valleys towards Târgu Ocna and Adjud (the Third Battle of Oituz). Pursuing the offensive, the German troops aimed at occupying the whole of Moldavia, thereby knocking Romania out of the war, and, together with an in-depth penetration of the Austro-Hungarian troops on the front in Bukovina, to push the Russian forces eastwards, beyond Odessa. The offensive of the German Ninth Army, from the Army Group Mackensen, started on 6 August 1917, when the units of the Russian Fourth Army on the Siret River were expected to leave their positions to reinforce the front in the north of Moldavia and be replaced by the divisions of the Romanian First Army (commanded by General Constantin Cristescu until 12 August, then by General Eremia Grigorescu).

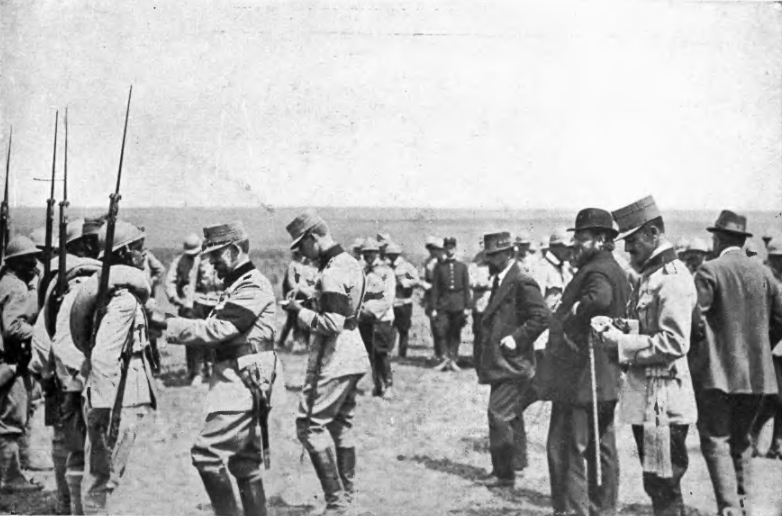
King Ferdinand decorating soldiers at the front

For 29 days, until 3 September, this sector was the scene of the most important battle fought by the Romanian army during the 1917 campaign. The Battle of Mărășești had three distinct stages. During the first stage (6–12 August), the troops of the Romanian First Army, together with Russian forces, managed to arrest the enemy advance and forced the Germans to change the direction of their attack toward the northwest gradually. In the second stage (13–19 August), the Romanian Command completely took over the command of the battle from the Russians. The confrontation reached its climax on 19 August, with the result that enemy's attempts to advance were completely thwarted. The third stage (20 August – 3 September) actually saw the last German attempt at least to improve their positions in view of a new offensive, this one also confounded by the Romanian response.

Starting on 8 August 1917, the fighting on the Mărășești front combined with an Austro-Hungarian-German offensive at Oituz. Holding out against superior enemy forces, the Romanian troops by 30 August stemmed the advance of the Gerok Group. The definitive cessation of the general offensive on the Romanian front by the Central Powers on 3 September 1917 marked a strategic defeat and a considerable weakening of their forces on the South-Eastern front. The response of the Romanian army in fact created the strongest blow to the Central Powers that was dealt in Eastern Europe in 1917.

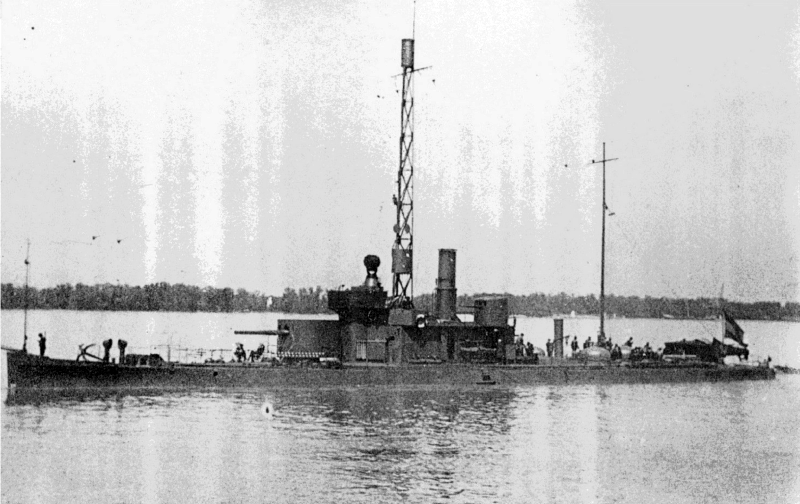
SMS Inn

As a result of these operations, the remaining Romanian territories remained unoccupied. Nearly 1,000,000 Central Powers troops were tied down, and The Times was prompted to describe the Romanian front as "The only point of light in the East".

On 22 September, Romania achieved its greatest naval success of the war, when the Austro-Hungarian river monitor SMS Inn struck a Romanian mine and sank near Brăila, the explosion killing the chief of staff of the Austro-Hungarian Danube Flotilla and a telegraphist and wounding 8 more sailors.

The situation, however, once again took a turn for the worse for the Entente in November 1917 with the October Revolution in Russia and the beginning of Russian Civil War. These events effectively ended Russian involvement in the war and left Romania isolated and surrounded by the Central Powers. It had little choice but to negotiate the Focșani Armistice, signed by the combatants on 9 December 1917.

== Aftermath ==
=== Treaty of Bucharest ===
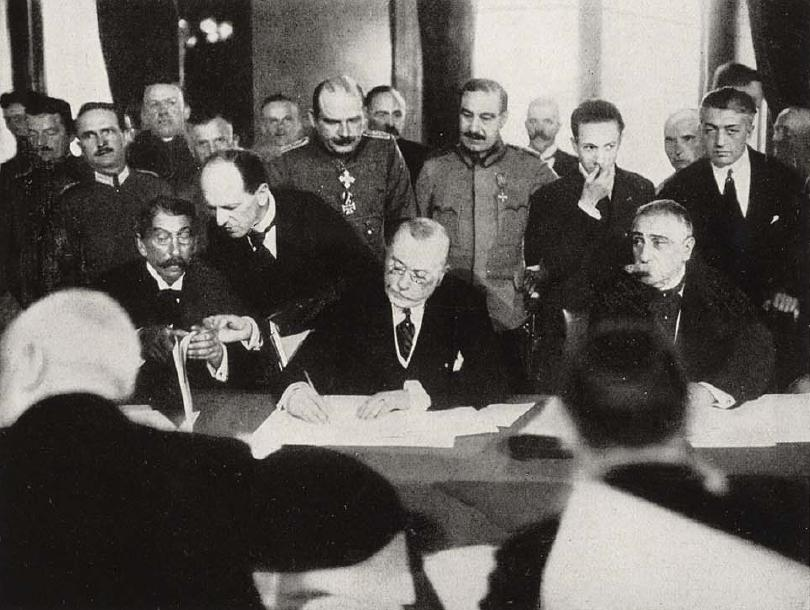
Alexandru Marghiloman signing the Treaty of Bucharest in 1918

The Arcul de Triumf in Bucharest marks Romania's victory in the First World War.

On 7 May 1918, in light of the existing politico-military situation, Romania was forced to conclude the Treaty of Bucharest with the Central Powers. It imposed harsh conditions on the country, but recognized its union with Bessarabia. Alexandru Marghiloman became the new German-sponsored prime minister. King Ferdinand, however, refused to sign the treaty. The Germans were able to repair the oil fields around Ploiești and by the end of the war had pumped a million tons of oil. They also requisitioned two million tons of grain from Romanian farmers. These materials were vital in keeping Germany in the war to the end of 1918.

Whereas the German army realized it needed close cooperation from the homefront, Habsburg officers saw themselves as entirely separate from the civilian world, and superior to it. When they occupied productive areas, such as southern Romania, they seized food stocks and other supplies for their own purposes and blocked any shipments intended for civilians back in the Austro-Hungarian Empire. The result was that the officers lived well, as the civilians began to starve. Vienna even transferred training units to Serbia and Poland for the sole purpose of feeding them. In all, the Army obtained about 15 percent of its cereal needs from occupied territories.

=== Romania reenters the war, November 1918 ===
After the successful Vardar Offensive on the Macedonian front that knocked Bulgaria out of World War I in the autumn of 1918, Romania re-entered the war, again on the side of the Allies, on 10 November 1918. This happened the day before the war ended in Western Europe, a day which marked the start of the Hungarian–Romanian War.

On 28 November 1918, the Romanian representatives of Bukovina voted for union with the Kingdom of Romania, followed by the proclamation of a Union of Transylvania with Romania on 1 December 1918 by the National Assembly of Romanians of Transylvania and Hungary, gathered at Alba Iulia, while the representatives of the Transylvanian Saxons approved the act on 9 January 1919 at an assembly in Mediaș (Medgyes). A similar gathering was held by the minority Hungarians in Cluj (Kolozsvár), on 22 December 1918, where they reaffirmed their allegiance to Hungary.

Germany agreed under the terms of the Treaty of Versailles (Article 259) to renounce the benefits provided by the Treaty of Bucharest in 1918.

The Romanian occupation of Transylvania was widely resented by Hungarians. The Hungarian–Romanian War ended with the Romanian army entering Budapest and the fall of the Hungarian Soviet Republic. The Romanians departed back to the demarcation lines only in early 1920.

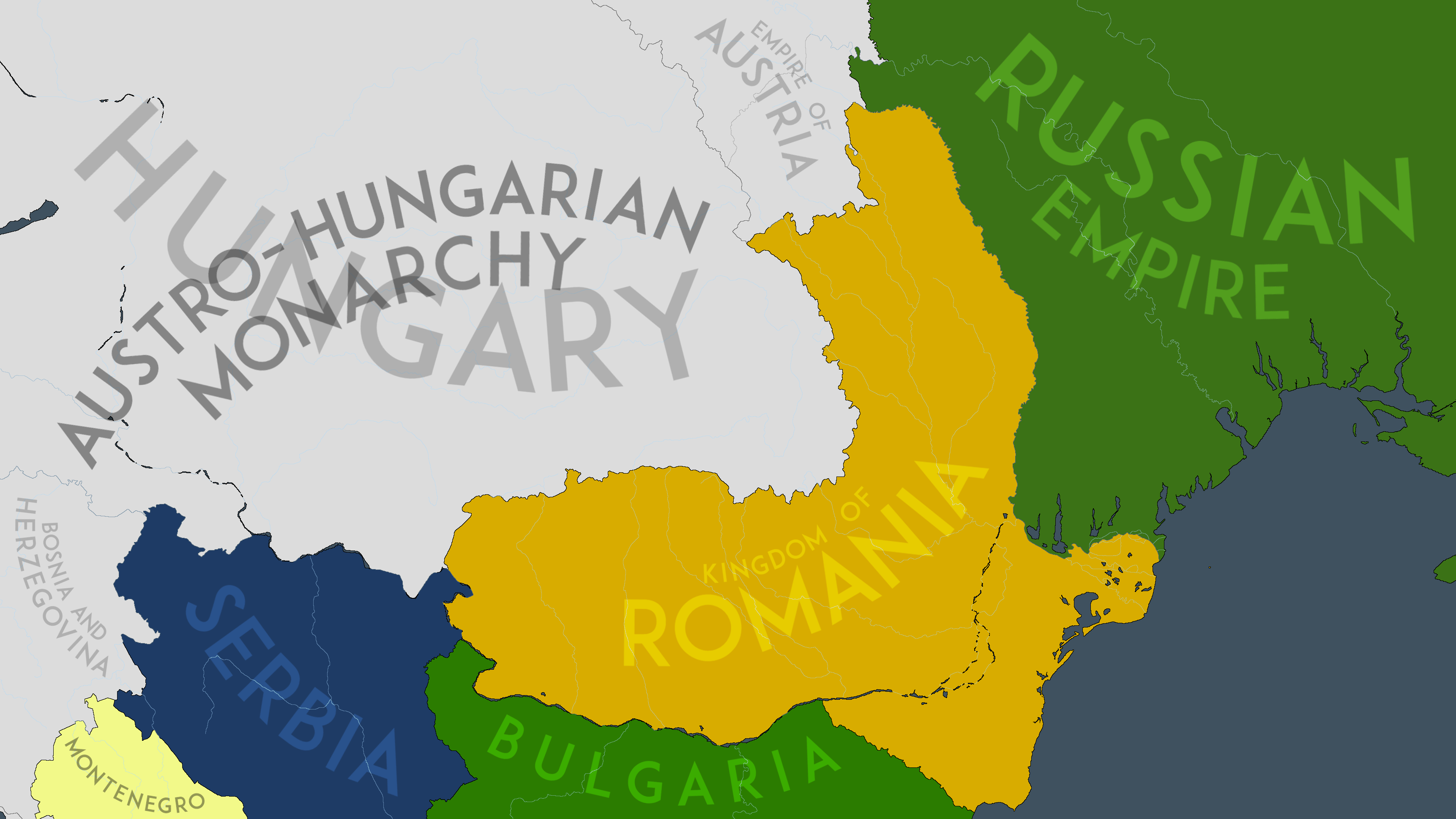
Romania in 1914, before the start of World War I.

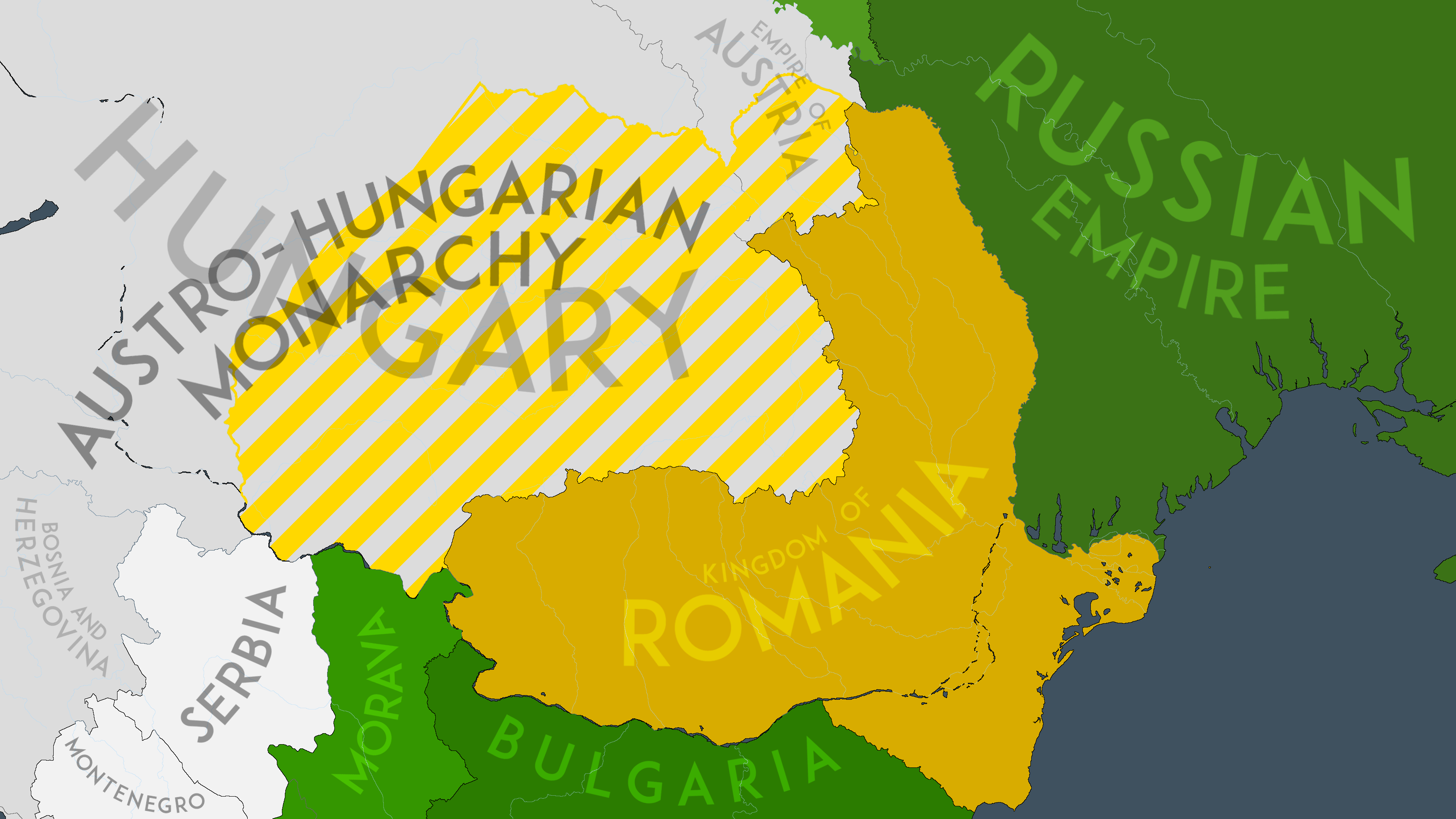
Map of the Treaty of Bucharest (1916), 10 days before Romania's entry to the war. Romanian claims are highlighted in yellow.

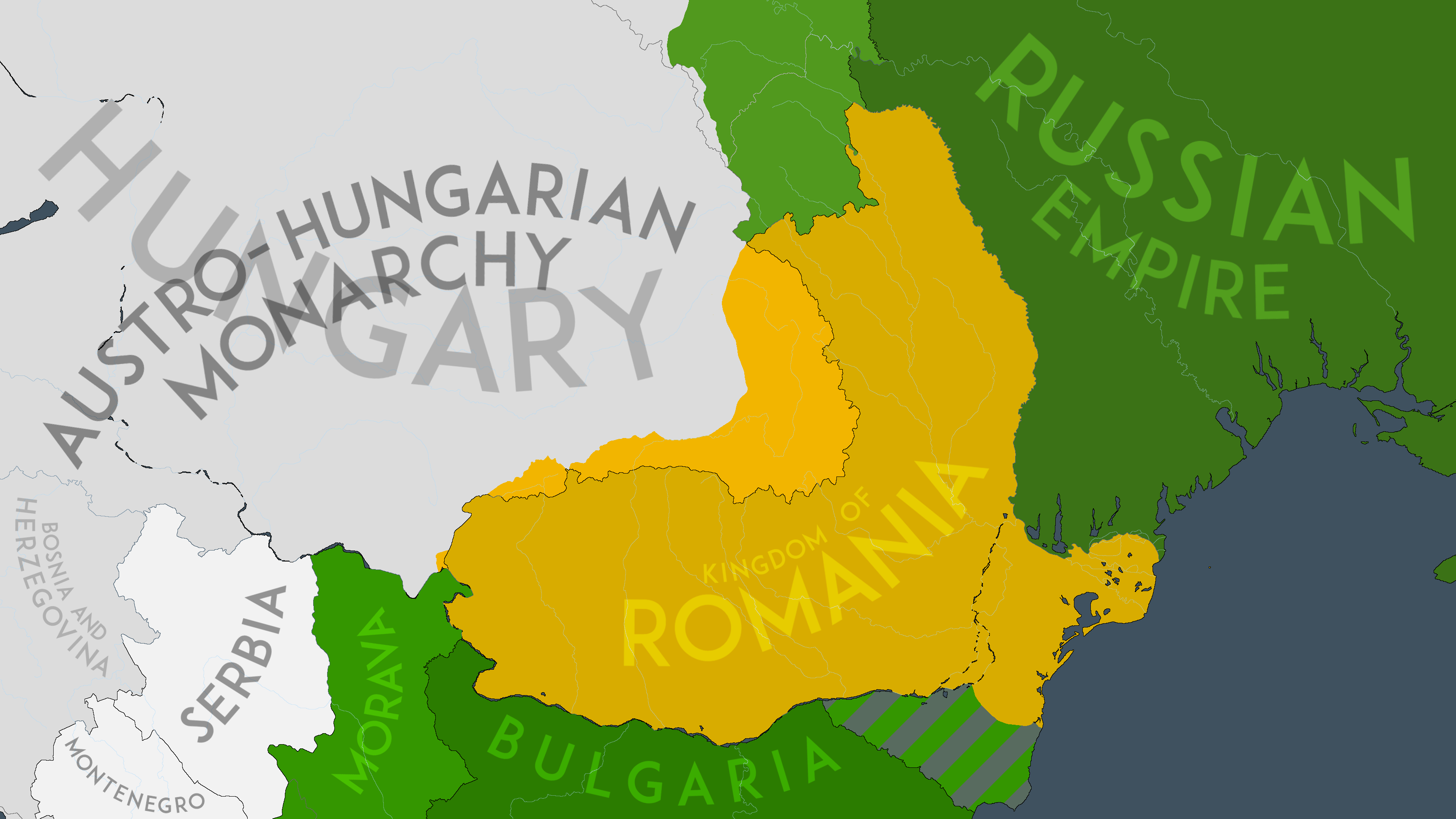
The extent of Romania's advance into Transylvania before the counteroffensive of the Central Powers.

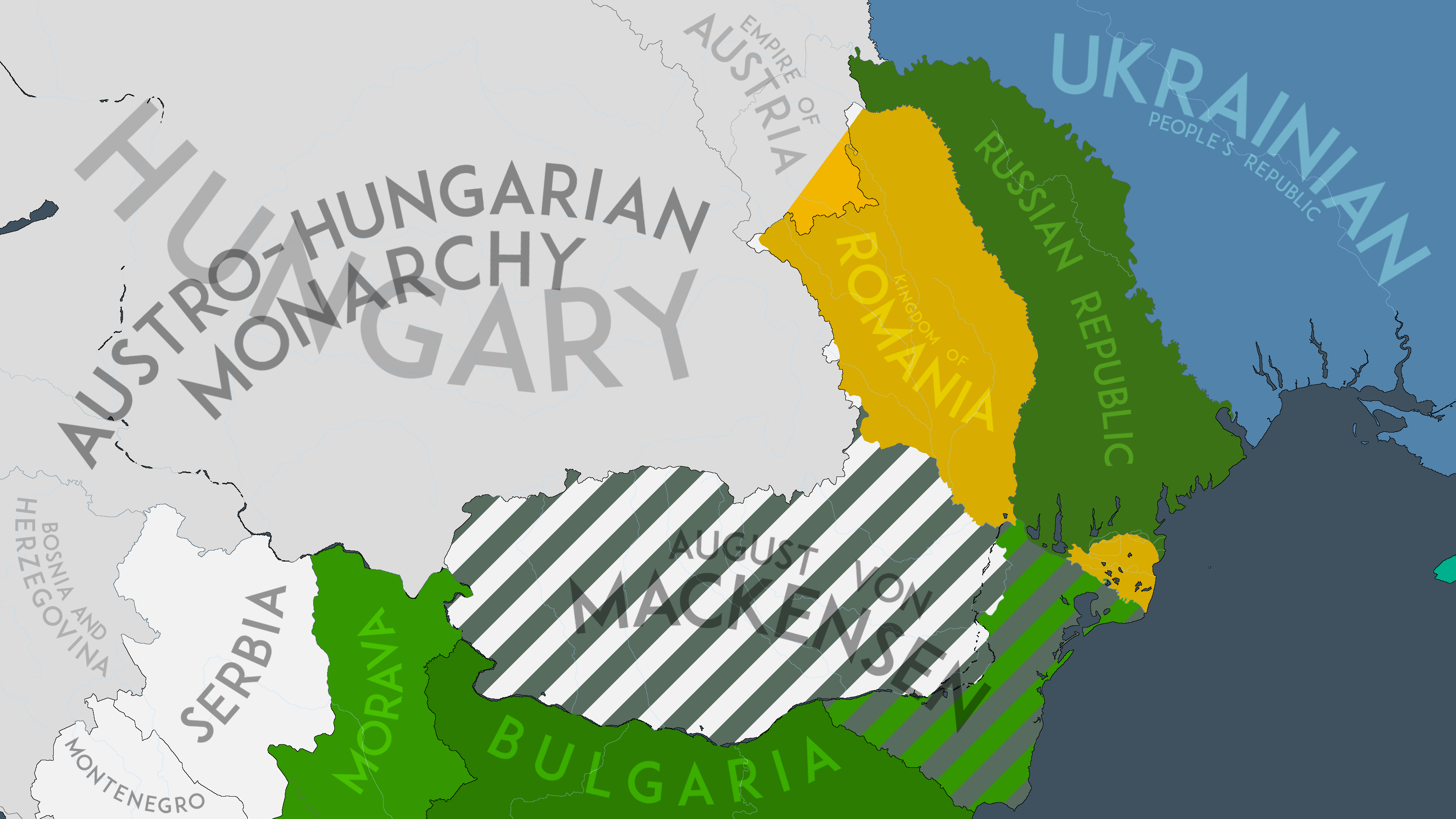
Map after the Armistice of Focșani.

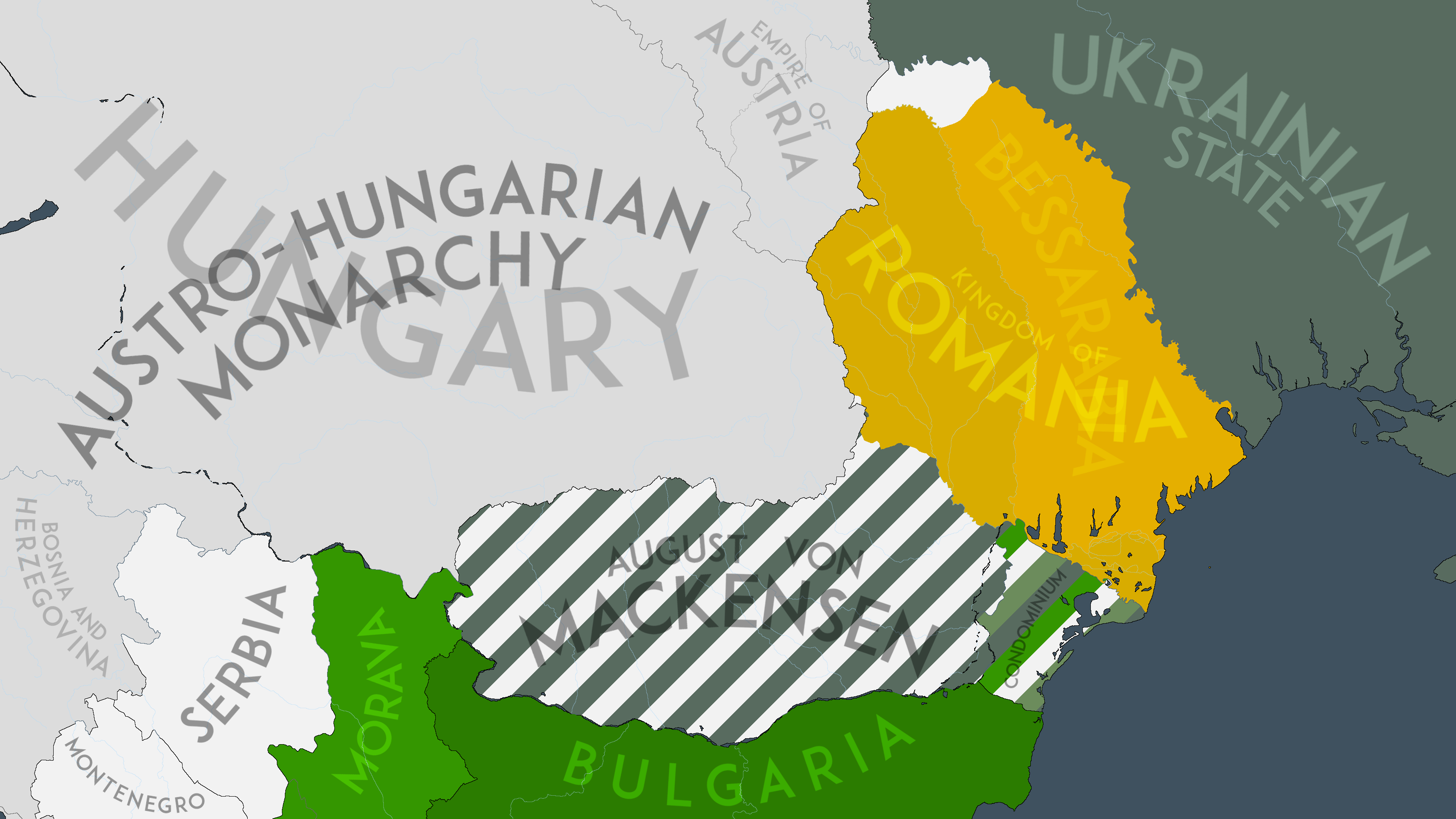
Map after the Treaty of Bucharest, which was never ratified by King Ferdinand I.

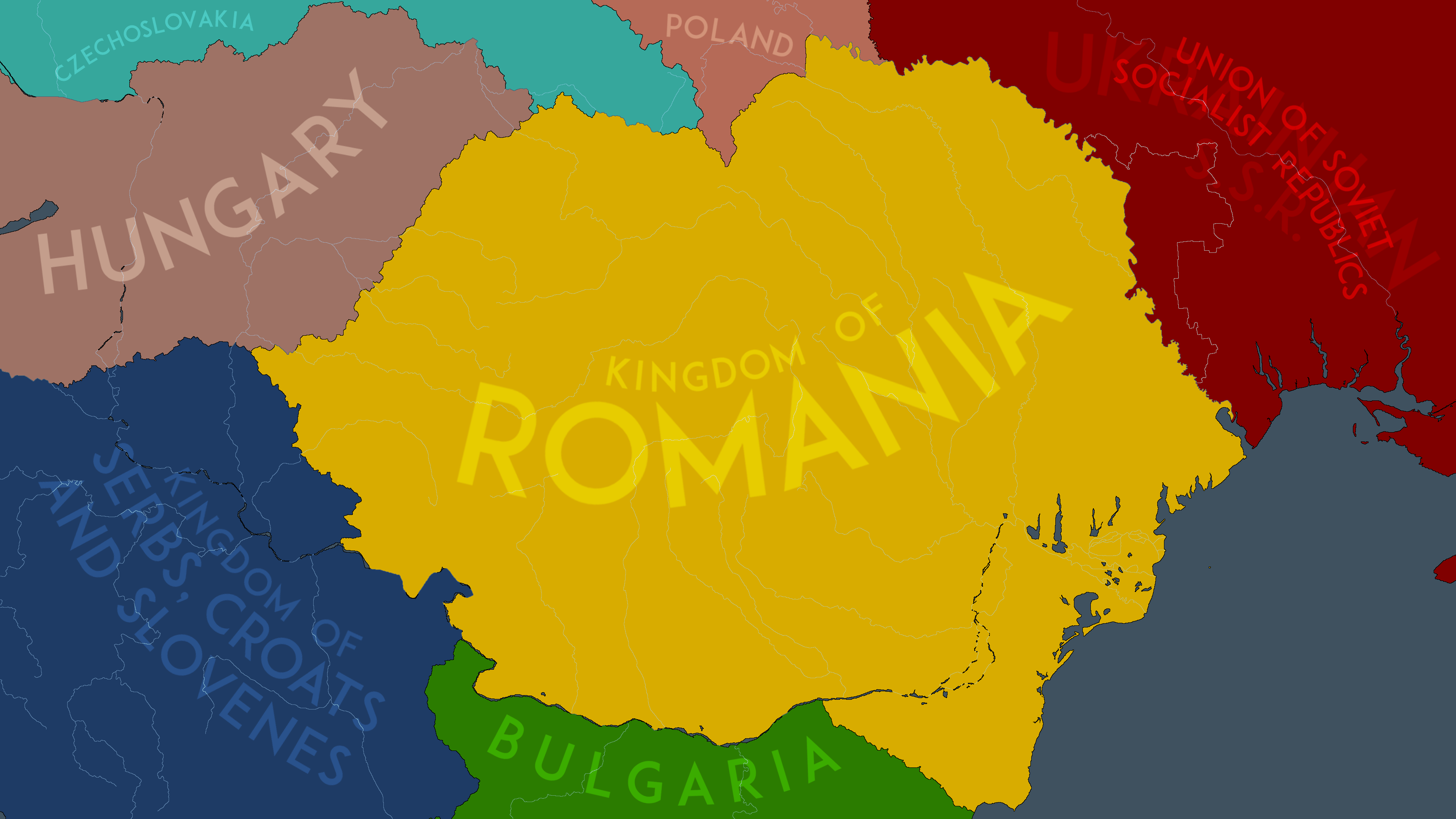
Map of Greater Romania in 1924, after consolidating the borders of the Treaty of Trianon.

== Military analysis of the campaign ==
Percentage of military deaths during World War I for the Entente Powers

The 1916 counteroffensive was mainly led by the German generals Falkenhayn and Mackensen. Despite this the Germans represented only 22% of the Central Power's forces that took part in the campaign compared to the Austro-Hungarian 46% and combined Bulgarian and Ottoman 32%.

In his 1922 book, A History of the Great War: From the Battle of Verdun to the Third Battle of Ypres, John Buchan provides a comprehensive analysis of the Romanian 1916 Campaign:

Contemporary history is rarely just to failure. Only when the mists have cleared and the main issues have been decided can the belligerents afford to weigh each section of a campaign in a just scale. Rumania's entry into the war had awakened baseless hopes among her Allies; her unsuccess – her inexplicable unsuccess, as it seemed to many – was followed by equally baseless criticism and complaint. The truth is, that when Brussilov and Sarrail had once failed to achieve their purpose, her chances of victory were gone. She had attempted a strategic problem which only a wild freak of fortune could have permitted her to solve. Her numbers from the start were too small, too indifferently trained, and too weakly supplied with guns. Nevertheless, once she stood with her back to the wall, this little people, inexpert in war, made a stalwart resistance. Let justice be done to the fortitude of the Rumanian retreat. Her generals were quick to grasp the elements of danger, and by their defence of the central passes prevented the swift and utter disaster of which her enemies dreamed. After months of fighting, during which his armies lost heavily, Falkenhayn gained Wallachia and the capital; but the plunder was not a tithe of what he had hoped for. The Rumanian expedition was, let it be remembered, a foraging expedition in part of its purpose, and the provender secured was small. The ten weeks of the retreat were marked by conspicuous instances of Rumanian quality in the field, and the battles of Hermannstadt and the Striu valley, the defence of the Predeal, Torzburg, and Rotherthurm Passes, the first battle of Targu Jiu, and Presan's counter-stroke on the Argesh were achievements of which any army might be proud. And the staunch valor of the Roman legionaries still lived in the heroic band who, under Anastasiu, cut their way from Orsova to the Aluta.

Erich Ludendorff summarized the end of the 1916 Romanian campaign as follows:

We had beaten the Rumanian Army; to annihilate it had proved impossible. We had done all that was possible, but found ourselves obliged to leave forces in the Dobrudja and Wallachia which we had been able to use on the Eastern and Western fronts and in Macedonia before Rumania came into the war. In spite of our victory over the Rumanian Army, we were definitely weaker as regards the conduct of the war as a whole.

The failure of the Romanian front for the Entente was also the result of several factors beyond Romania's control. The failed Salonika Offensive did not meet the expectation of Romania's "guaranteed security" from Bulgaria. This proved to be a critical strain on Romania's ability to wage a successful offensive in Transylvania, as it needed to divert troops south to the defense of Dobruja. Furthermore, Russian reinforcements in Romania did not materialize to the number of 200,000 soldiers initially demanded.

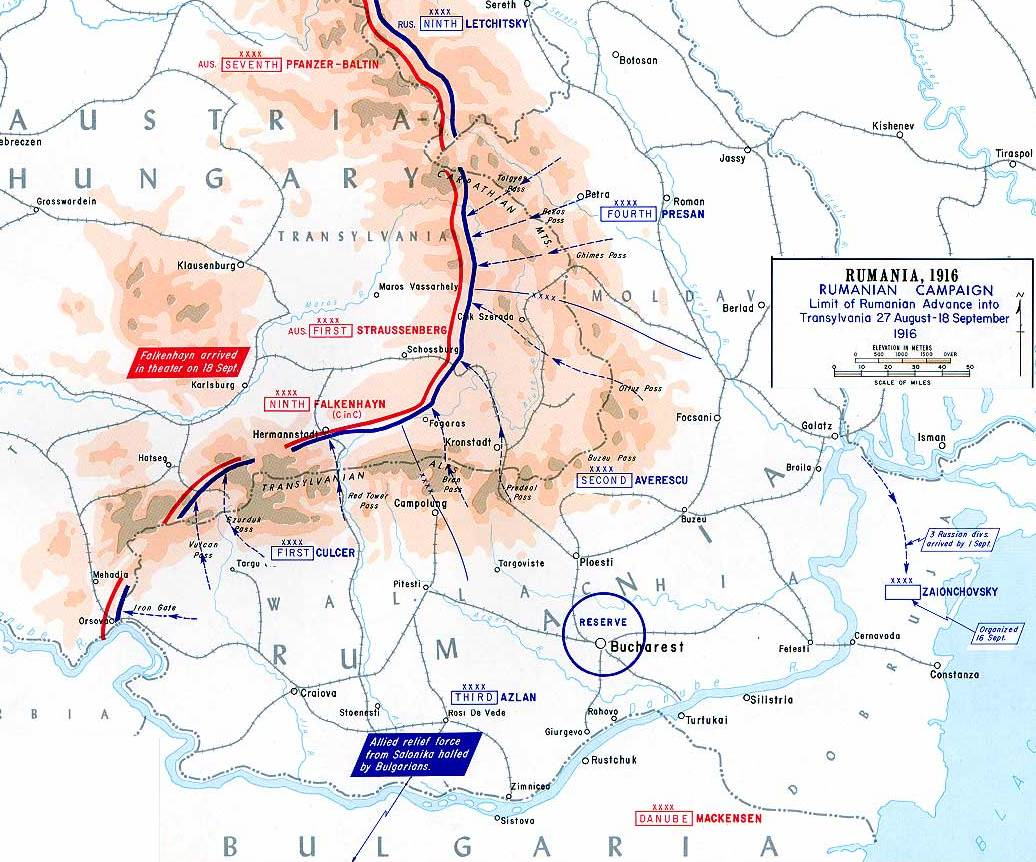
Romanian invasion of Austria-Hungary, August 1916

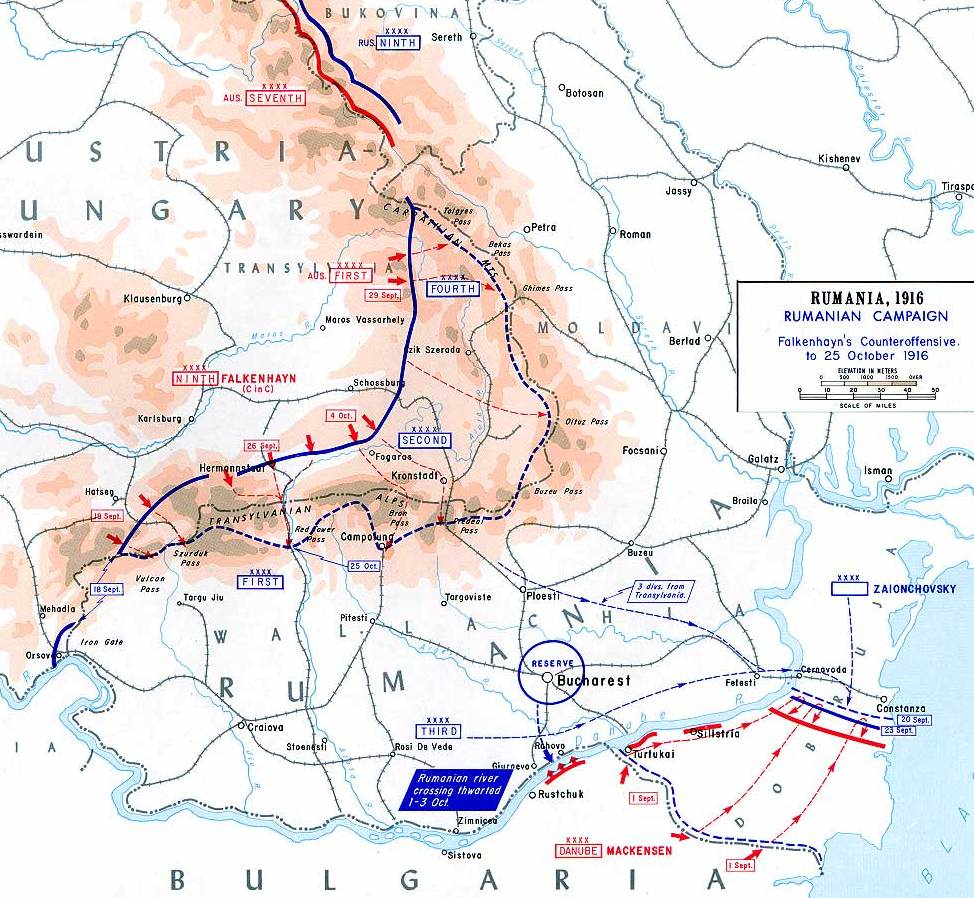
Central Powers counterattack, September–October 1916

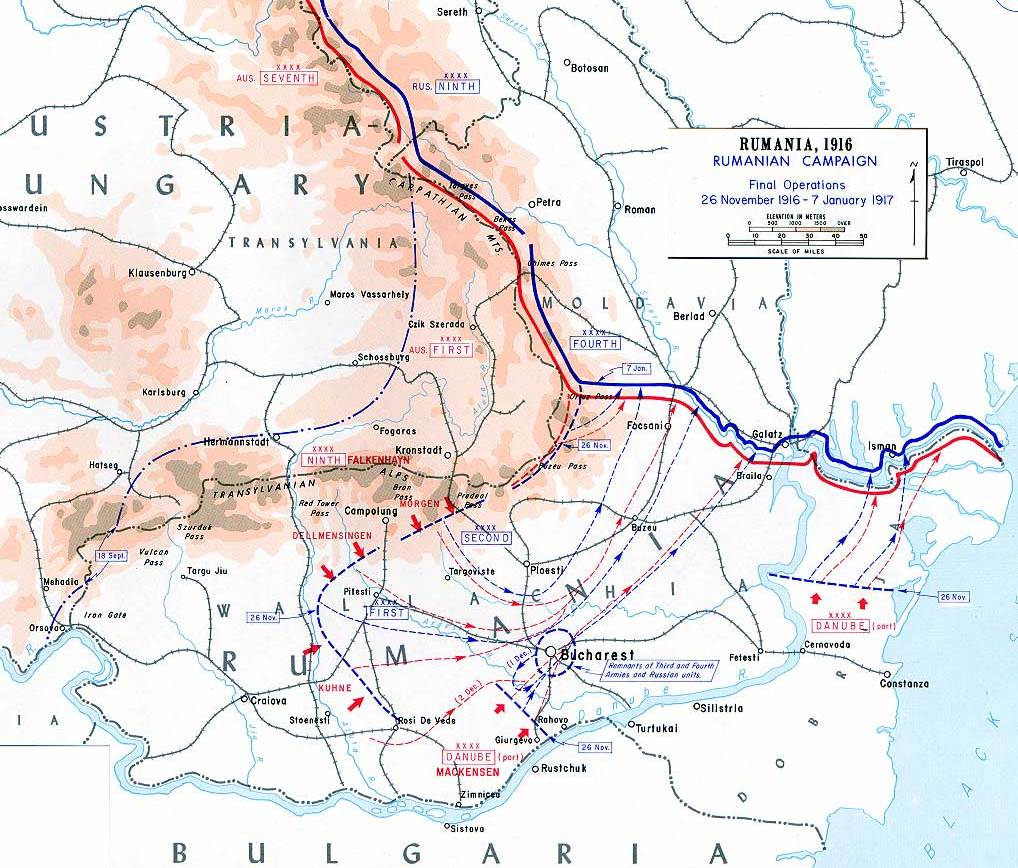
Operations in Romania, November 1916 to January 1917

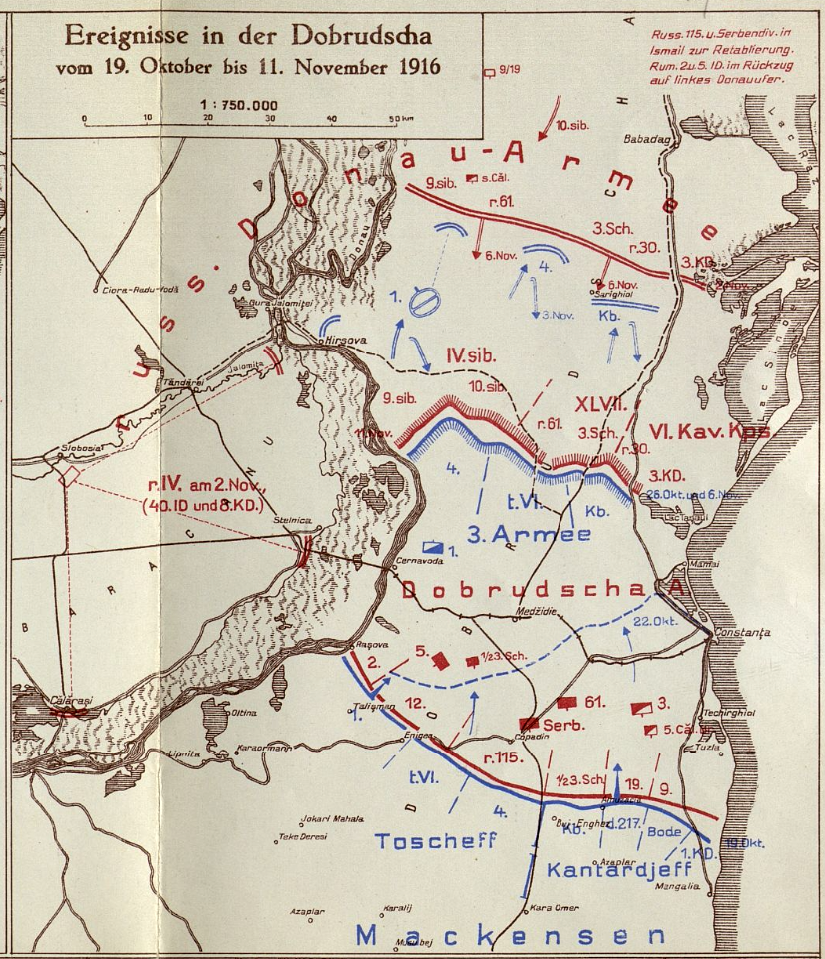
Operations in Dobruja, 19 October to 11 November 1916

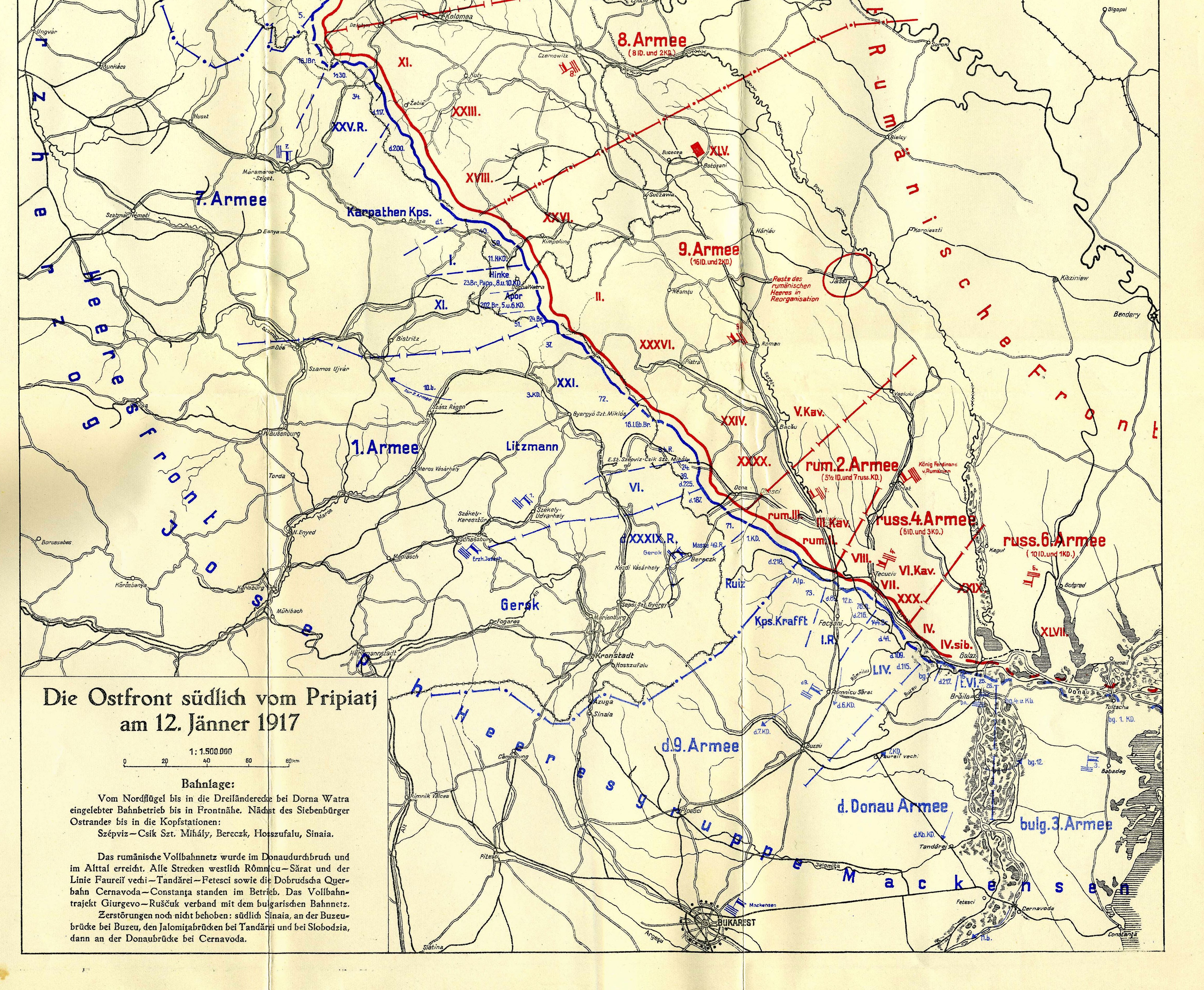
Romanian front, 12 January 1917

== See also ==
- Diplomatic history of World War I
- Romanian Navy during World War I
- Romanian Air Corps

== Notes ==
Preceded by Kingdom of Romania	History of Romania	Succeeded by Greater Romania
