= Romanian Front (Russian Empire) =

Russian and Romanian army group in WWI

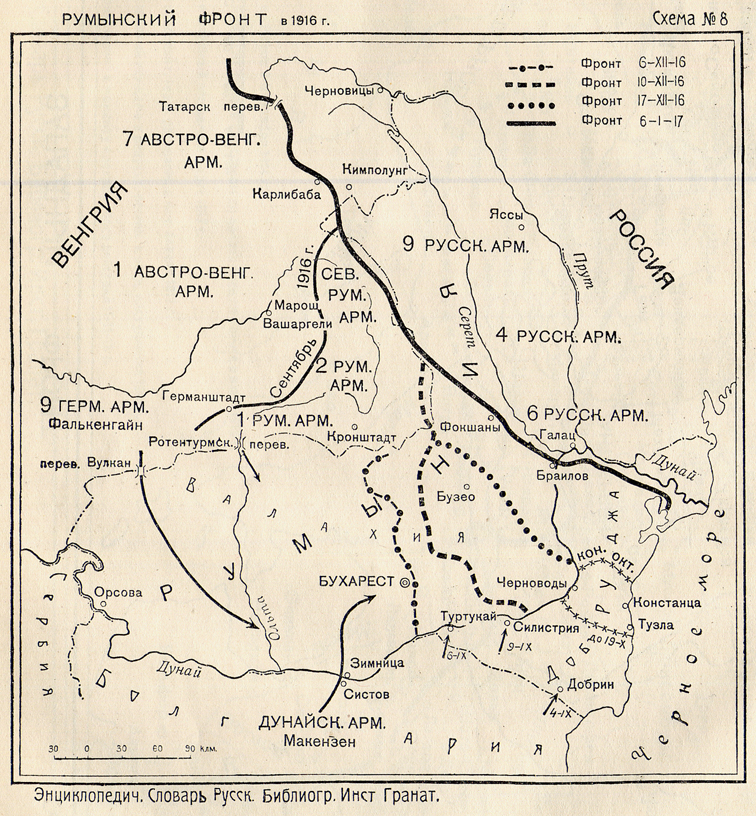
The Romanian Front, late 1916

The Romanian Front (Russian: Румынский фронт) was an army group level command (Note: A "front" is the Russian equivalent of an army group, not to be confused with a geographic theater of operations.) of the Imperial Russian Army and the Romanian Army during the First World War.

== Overview ==
The front was created in mid-December 1916 out of the headquarters of the former Russian Danube Army, following the defeat of Romanian Army forces at the Battle of Turtucaia in Southern Dobrudja. Nominally. the commanding officer of the front was King Ferdinand I of Romania; however, the de facto power lay in his "deputies," which were Imperial Russian Army generals delegated by the Russian Stavka.

Initially the front consisted of three armies: the Russian 4th, 6th, and 9th Armies. Soon it was joined by the forces of the Romanian 1st Army under General Constantin Cristescu and the Romanian Second Army under Alexandru Averescu, and, in September 1917, by the Russian 8th Army.

Following the October Revolution of 7 November 1917, the front was merged with the Southwestern Front as the Ukrainian Front under administration of the Central Rada of Ukraine.

== Composition ==
=== Command ===
Commander in Chief

- 1916 – 1918 King of Romania Ferdinand I

Deputies of the Commander in Chief

- 12.12.1916 – 01.04.1917 — General of Cavalry Vladimir Viktorovich Sakharov
- 11.04.1917 – 25.03.1918 — General of Infantry Dmitry Shcherbachev

Chief of Staff

- 12.12.1916 – 08.04.1917 – General Mikhail Shishkevich
- 17.04.1917 – 15.10.1917 – General Nikolai Golovin
- 23.10.1917 – ? – General Georgy Viranovsky

=== Components ===
- Danubian Army (as a separate army of the Southwestern Front supporting the Romanian Armed Forces, merged with the Russian 6th Army)

Original composition (December 1916)

- 4th Army (from Western Front, General Alexander Ragoza (HQ in Bacău))
  - 8th Army Corps (General Anton Denikin)
  - 7th Army Corps (General Arkadiy Sychevskiy)
  - 30th Army Corps (?)
  - separate formations
- 6th Army (from Petrograd, General Afanasiy Tsurikov (HQ in Bolhrad))
  - 4th Army Corps (General Eris Khan Aliev)
  - 47th Army Corps (General V. Artyomov?)
  - 4th Siberian Army Corps (General Leonid-Otto Sirelius)
  - 3rd Cavalry Corps (General Fyodor Arturovich Keller)
  - 6th Cavalry Corps (General Aleksandr Pavlov)
- 9th Army (from Southwestern Front, General Platon Lechitsky (HQ in Kamianets-Podilskyi))
  - 26th Army Corps (General Yevgeny Miller)
  - 2nd Army Corps (General Vasily Flug)
  - 36th Army Corps (General Nikolai Korotkevich)
  - 24th Army Corps (General Konstantin Nekrasov)
  - 40th Army Corps (General Georgy Bergmann)
  - 5th Cavalry Corps (General Leonid Veliashev)
- Reserve
  - 29th Army Corps (General Nikolai Lisovskiy)
- 2nd Romanian Army (General Alexandru Averescu)
- Danube detachment

Later added (Summer 1917)

- 1st Romanian Army (General Constantin Cristescu)
- 8th Army (August 1917 from Southwestern Front, General Mikhail Sokovin (HQ in Mohyliv-Podilskyi))
  - 11th Army Corps (General Konstantin Gilchevsky)
  - 16th Army Corps (General Nikolai Stogov)
  - 23rd Army Corps (General Mikhail Promtov)
  - 33rd Army Corps (General Mikhail Samoilov)
  - 2nd Cavalry Corps (General K. Tumanov?)

Other formations (uncertain status)

- 10th Army Corps (General Nikolai Danilov)
- 18th Army Corps (General Andrei Zayonchkovski)

== See also ==
- List of Imperial Russian Army formations and units
- Romania during World War I
- Moldavian Democratic Republic (Bessarabia Governorate)
- Rumcherod
- Romanian Front electoral district (Russian Constituent Assembly election, 1917)
