= NMS Smeul =

NMS Smeul is the name of the following ships of the Royal Romanian Navy:

- NMS Smeul (1888)
- NMS Smeul (1920)
