= Romanian Front electoral district =

Constituency of the Russian Republic

The Romanian Front electoral district (Russian: избирательный округ Румынского фронта) was a constituency created for the 1917 Russian Constituent Assembly election. The electoral district covered the Romanian Front of the Russian Army. Moreover, the constituency covered the Danube Flotilla.

Unlike the Western Front, the Romanian Front was remote from events in the mother country and relatively untouched by Bolshevik agitation for immediate peace. As of the spring of 1917, the soldiers' organizations of the Romanian Front were dominated by officers, who repressed revolutionary soldier organizers.

According to U.S. historian Oliver Henry Radkey some 12,000-15,000 votes appeared to be missing from official records.

== Results ==
Romanian Front
Party	Vote	%
List 3 - Socialist-Revolutionaries and Soviet of Peasants Deputies	666,438	59.05
List 1 - United Ukrainian Socialists	186,219	16.50
List 6 - Bolsheviks	173,804	15.40
List 4 - Mensheviks	36,115	3.20
List 2 - Muslim Socialists	23,136	2.05
List 7 - Kadets	21,443	1.90
List 5 - Popular Socialists	4,514	0.40
List 9 -Lettish Soldiers	3,386	0.30
List 8 - Moldovan SRs	?	
Unaccounted	13,545	1.20
Total:	1,128,600	

Deputies Elected
Grischenko	Ukrainian Socialist Bloc
Petliura	Ukrainian Socialist Bloc
Pisnachevsky	Ukrainian Socialist Bloc
Ternichenko	Ukrainian Socialist Bloc
Abramov	SR
Alekseevsky	SR
Andrianov	SR
Bocharnikov	SR
Bylinkin	SR
Erofeev	SR
Ilinskiy	SR
Kotlin	SR
Krakovetsky	SR
Lordkipanidze	SR
Markov	SR
Shmelyov	SR
Krylenko	Bolshevik
Mostovenko	Bolshevik
Ryazanov	Bolshevik
Solers	Bolshevik
