= Dobruja Army =

The Dobruja Army (Russian: Добруджанская армия, Romanian: Armata de Dobrogea) was a World War I Russian, Romanian and Serbian field army that fought on the Romanian Front.

Field management was established in August 1916. The army was based primarily on the newly established 47th Army Corps and was sent to Romania to help defend Dobruja from a Bulgarian-German attack from the south. The core of the Dobruja Army was the 47th Russian Army Corps. The Commander of the Army was General Andrei Zayonchkovski.

The components of the Army were:

- The 47th Army Corps.
- Separate Romanian and Serbian divisions.

The Dobruja Army was disbanded in October 1916 after the loss of the Cernavodă–Constanța line (following the Second Battle of Cobadin) and became part of the Russian Danube Army.

== See also ==
- List of Russian armies in World War I
