= Hypothesis Z =

Romanian war plan for World War I

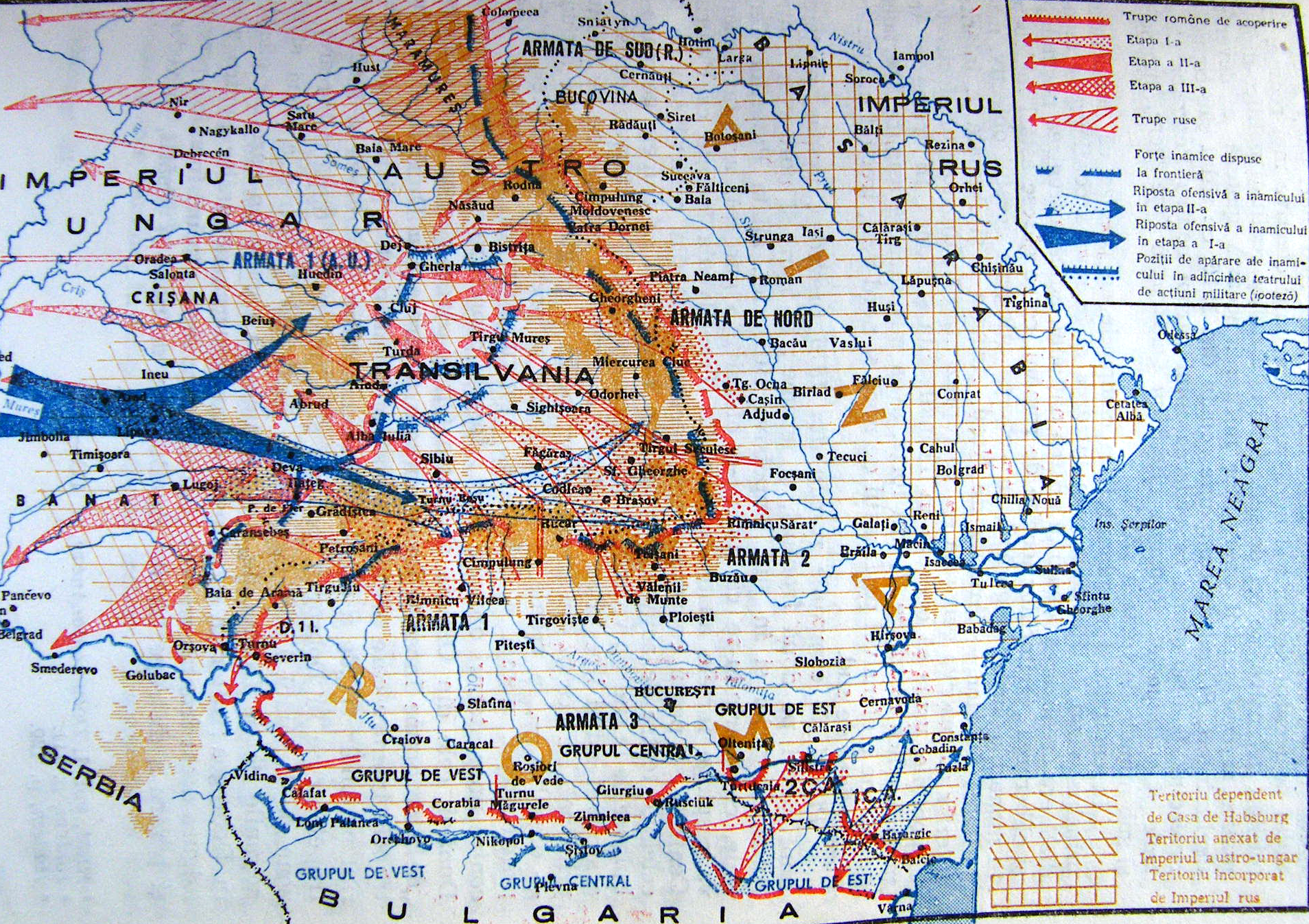
Hypothesis Z, the initial Romanian war plan for World War I

Hypothesis Z (Romanian: Ipoteza Z), sometimes known as Plan Z (Romanian: Planul Z), was the name of Romania's first war plan for World War I. It was based on an offensive against Austria-Hungary in Transylvania and a simultaneous defense of the country against Bulgarian attacks in the south. Once Russian forces had arrived in Dobruja, the Romanian Army would launch another offensive against Bulgaria. Hypothesis Z was definitively developed and completed by July 1916. Its application in the war which Romania entered in August 1916 was unsuccessful, but its main objective, to achieve the unification of the Romanian nation, was realised anyway after the war.

== History ==
When World War I began, the Chief of the Romanian General Staff began studying and elaborating several war plans with the objective of attending state interests in the new political and military scenario of Europe. The war plans were called "operation plans" or "hypotheses" and had several variants with the intention of adapting to any possible military situation. The plans were developed with the idea that a war against Romania could exist in three directions: south, northwest and east. Operations related to the south of the country (against Bulgaria) were assigned the letter A (Hypothesis A), those related to the northwest (against Austria-Hungary) had the letter B (Hypothesis B) and those related to the eastern border (the one with Russia) had the letter C (Hypothesis C). The plans had many subvariants, which were differentiated through numbers (i.e., Hypothesis A1, Hypothesis A2, etc.).

Between 1914 and 1916, subvariants of the hypotheses were prepared and studied. They initially treated a possible war with Russia but eventually switched mainly to a potential invasion of Austro-Hungarian territory and the defence of the border with Bulgaria. This plan came to be known as Hypothesis B3. Between March and April 1916, the last studies of the subvariant were performed, and it was agreed that it would be used in the case of war. Thus, it was determined that Romania would launch an offensive against Austria-Hungary and defend itself from Bulgaria, with Hypothesis B3 earning the name of "Hypothesis Z". Romania was supposed to defend itself from Bulgarian attacks until the arrival of Russian troops in Dobruja, and only then, it would begin an offensive into Bulgarian territory.

The Chief of the Romanian General Staff finalised the Romanian war plan in July 1916 and began distributing it to Romanian commanders. Hypothesis Z had Romania intend to conquer all territories from Austria-Hungary populated by Romanians and the unification of the Romanian nation. Hypothesis Z started its application after the entrance of Romania into World War I in August 1916. According to it, the Northern Army, the First Army and the Second Army (about 75% of the Romanian Army) were to begin an offensive in Transylvania towards Brașov, Târgu Mureș, Cluj-Napoca and finally Budapest. On the other hand, the Third Army (the remaining 25%) would stay on the Danube and in Dobruja to defend Romania from Bulgarian attacks. The Fifth Army Corps, constituting the army reserve, would initially be placed near Bucharest and then move to Transylvania. The Romanian Danube Flotilla was placed near the Dobrujan port of Turtucaia. The total number of soldiers to participate was 562,847, 420,324 for the Transylvanian front and 142,523 for the Bulgarian front.

In the end, even though the Romanian Army faced initial defeats during the war, the aim of Hypothesis Z, the national unification of the Romanians, was achieved on its aftermath by the Great Union.

== See also ==
- Romania during World War I
- Romanian Campaign (1916)
