= Danube Army (Russian Empire, 1916) =

The Russian Danube Army was a World War I Russian field army that fought on the Romanian Front.

Field management was established in November 1916, when the Dobruja Army was disbanded after the loss of the Cernavodă-Constanța line (following the Second Battle of Cobadin) to the German-Bulgarian-Ottoman Army under command of August von Mackensen.

The army consisted of:

- the 47th Army Corps (General Vasiliy Artemiev)
  - 61st Infantry Division (General Panteleimon Simanskiy)
  - 115th Infantry Division (General Aleksandr Freiman)
  - 3rd Caucasian Rifle Division (General Feliks Iozefovich)
  - 3rd Don Cossack Division (General Aleksandr Dolgorukov)
  - 27th Mortar Artillery Battalion
- the 6th Cavalry Corps (General Aleksandr Pavlov)
  - 12th Cavalry Division (General Carl Gustaf Emil Mannerheim)
  - Trans-Amur Horse Division (General Georgiy Rozalion-Soshalskiy)
  - 4th Armed Vehicle Division (Lieutenant Colonel Orest Zhelyabuzhskiy)
  - 10th Armed Vehicle Detachment
  - 11th Armed Vehicle Detachment
  - 12th Armed Vehicle Detachment

The commander of the Army was General Vladimir Viktorovich Sakharov.

In December 1916, the Army was renamed to the 6th Army and became part of the Russian Romanian Front.

== See also ==
- List of Russian armies in World War I
