= 5th Cavalry Corps (Russian Empire) =

4th Cavalry Corps
- Country: Russian Empire
- Allegiance: Imperial Russian Army
- Engagements: World War I

The 5th Cavalry Corps was a cavalry corps in the Imperial Russian Army.

== Part of ==
- 8th Army: (September 1, 1915 - October 15, 1916)
- 9th Army: (October 20, 1916 - June 8, 1917)
- 7th Army: 1917 (from June 16, 1917)
- 11th Army: (July 23 - October 18, 1917 and November 1 - December 1, 1917)

== Commanders ==
- Lieutenant General L. Wieliaszew (from November 1915)
