= List of Russian armies in World War I =

Russian army formations in World War I include:

- 1st Army
- 2nd Army
- 3rd Army
- 4th Army
- 5th Army
- 6th Army
- 7th Army
- 8th Army
- 9th Army
- 10th Army
- 11th Army
- 12th Army
- 13th Army
- Caucasus Army
- Dobruja Army
- Danube Army
- Special Army

== See also ==
- Lists of armies
- Imperial Russian Army formations and units (1914)
