= 40th Army Corps (Russian Empire) =

- Country: Russian Empire
- Allegiance: Imperial Russian Army
- Engagements: First World War

The 40th Army Corps was an Army corps in the Imperial Russian Army during the First World War.

== Part of ==
- 8th Army: 2 October 1915 – 11 September 1916
- Russian Special Army: 15 September 1916 – 22 October 1916
- 9th Army: 28 October 1916 – December 1917
