= 6th Army (Russian Empire) =

Russian army in the First World War

The Russian Sixth Army was a World War I Russian field army that fought on the Eastern theatre of war.

The 6th Army Field Headquarters was established in July 1914 at the Saint Petersburg Military District from the few troops that remained in the area after the 9th Army was moved towards the front.

Between July 1914 and December 1916, the Army was tasked with defending St. Petersburg and the Baltic and White Seas' coasts. In August 1915, it became part of the newly formed Northern Front. With the creation of the Romanian Front in December 1916, the staff was transferred to the Danube Army in Romania, which was renamed the 6th Army. The old 6th Army units became part of the Northern Front.

== Commanders ==
- 1912-09-01 – 1914-08-26 — General of the Infantry Alexander Blagoveshchensky
- 1914-08-26 – 1915-06-21 — General of the Artillery Konstantin Fan-der-Flit
- 1915-06-30 – 1915-08-18 — General of the Infantry Nikolai Ruzsky
- 1915-08-20 – 1916-03-20 — General of the Infantry Aleksiej Czurin
- 1916-03-20 – 1916-12-12 — General of the Infantry Vladimir Gorbatovsky
- 1916-12-12 – 1917-12 — General of the Cavalry Afanasy Curikov

== See also ==
- List of Russian armies in World War I
- List of Imperial Russian Army formations and units
