= 47th Army Corps (Russian Empire) =

- Country: Russian Empire
- Allegiance: Imperial Russian Army

The 47th Army Corps was an Army corps in the Imperial Russian Army. From 7 September 1916 it became the core formation of the multi-national Russian Dobrudja Army.
