= NMS Smeul (1888) =

Romanian Navy torpedo boat

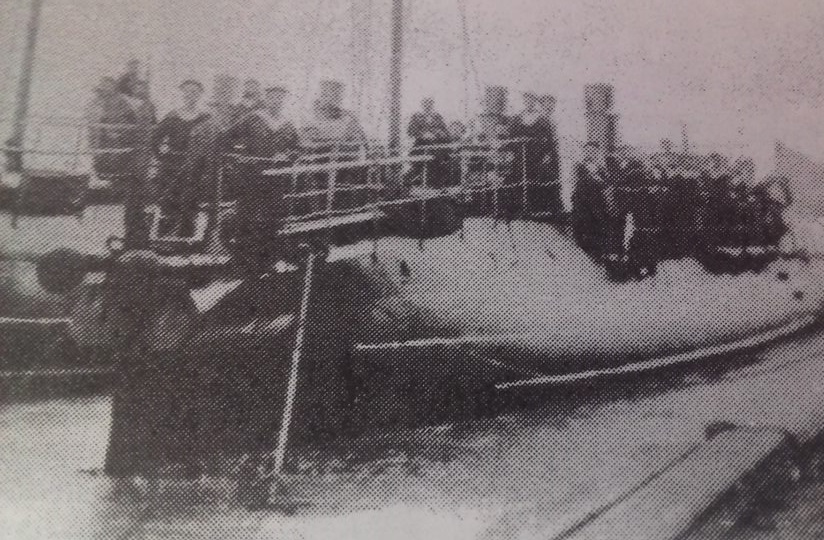
- Smeul in 1888

History

Romania
- Name: Smeul
- Builder: Casa de Forges et Chantiers de la Méditéranée, Le Havre, France
- Laid down: 1888
- Commissioned: 1888
- Out of service: 16 April 1917
- Fate: Capsized during a storm

Service record
- Commanders: Nicolae Gonța
- Operations: Defence of Sulina; U-boat Campaign (World War I)
- Victories: 1 submarine sunk; 1 submarine damaged

General characteristics
- Class & type: Sborul-class torpedo boat
- Type: Torpedo boat
- Displacement: 56 tons (standard)
- Length: 36.78 m (120 ft 8 in)
- Draft: 2.13 m (7 ft 0 in)
- Propulsion: Steam, 540 hp
- Speed: 16 knots (30 km/h; 18 mph)
- Complement: 20
- Armament: 2 × 37 mm Hotchkiss revolving guns; 2 x 356 mm torpedo tubes

NMS Smeul was a torpedo boat of the Romanian Navy. She was part of a class of three named the Sborul-class, built in France for the Romanian Navy in 1888. She and her two sister ships saw service during World War I.

== Construction and specifications ==
Along with her two sister ships, Năluca and Sborul, she was built at Casa de Forges et Chantiers de la Méditéranée in Le Havre, France. She was built and commissioned in 1888. She displaced 56 tons, measuring 36.78 meters in length. Top speed amounted to 16 knots, generated by a 540 hp steam engine. Armament consisted of two five-barreled 37 mm Hotchkiss revolving guns, two 356 mm torpedo tubes and one spar torpedo. Smeul's sisters were rebuilt in 1907, their boilers and chimneys being reduced from two to one. During this refit, the two 37 mm revolving guns were replaced by one machine gun. They had a crew of 20 and drew 2.13 meters (7 feet) of water, carrying 7 tons of coal. Thus, Smeul was the only one of her class to retain her original armament of two 37 mm revolving guns. This allowed her to effectively engage enemy ground troops, aircraft and submarines.

== Service ==
Commanded by Captain Nicolae Gonța, she fought the only naval engagement at sea of the Romanian Navy during the entire First World War, due in part to her being the only Romanian sea-going warship able to engage an enemy ship in combat. The engagement took place on 30 September 1916, near Sulina, when the German submarine UB-42 launched a torpedo at Smeul as the latter was escorting two minesweeping motorboats. However, the torpedo missed and the Romanian torpedo boat counterattacked, damaging the submarine's periscope and conning tower and forcing her to retreat.

In November 1916, the German submarine UC-15 was sent on a minelaying mission off Sulina and never returned, being sunk by her own mines. This was probably caused by an encounter with Smeul, whose captain surprised a German submarine near Sulina in November 1916, the latter reportedly never returning to her base at Varna. This could only be UC-15, whose systems most likely malfunctioned after being forced to submerge in the shallow waters, upon encountering the Romanian torpedo boat.

On 16 April 1917, Smeul capsized in rough seas off the mouth of the Danube with the loss of 18 of her crew, including 3 French naval officers present on board. This incident has been incorrectly attributed to Ottoman mines in several English language sources, possibly as a result of wartime propaganda by the Central Powers.
