= 9th Army (Russian Empire) =

The Russian 9th Army was a World War I Russian field army that fought on the Eastern theatre of war.

Field management was established in August 1914. The unit fought on the Southwestern Front from August 1914 to December 1916 and then on the Romanian Front, until it was disbanded in 1918.

== Commanders ==
- 9 August 1914 – 18 April 1917 — General of Infantry Platon Lechitsky
- 18 April 1917 – 11 August 1917 — Lieutenant-General Gieorgij Stupin
- 11 August 1917 – 9 September 1917 — Lieutenant-General Vladimir Cheremisov
- 9 September 1917 – ? September 1917 — Lieutenant-General Julian Bielozor
- ? September 1917 – ? November 1917 — Lieutenant-General Anatolij Kiełczewskij

== See also ==
- List of Russian armies in World War I
- List of Imperial Russian Army formations and units
