= Battle for the Vistula bridgehead =

Second Battle of the Vistula River
- Part of the Eastern Front during World War I
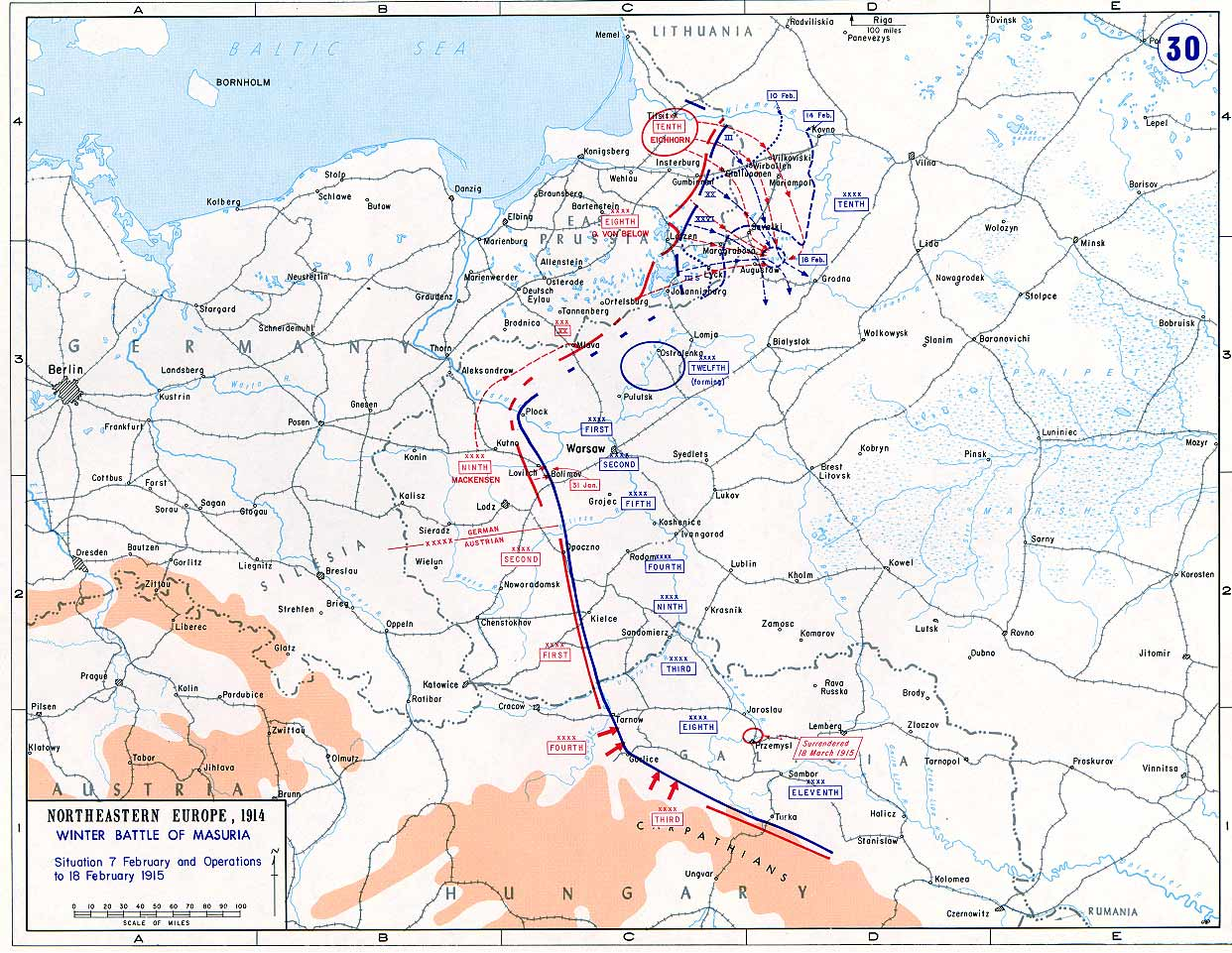
- Eastern Front, 1915.
| Date | February 27 – March 21, 1915 |
| Location | Near Vistula, Congress Poland, Russian Empire (present-day Poland) |
| Result | Russian victory |

Belligerents
| German Empire | Russian Empire |

Commanders and leaders
| (German Empire) August von Mackensen | Vladimir Smirnov; Vasily Gurko |

Units involved
| (German Empire) 9th Army | 2nd Army; 5th Army |

Strength
| only combat troops: 75,000–80,000 men 280 machine guns 504 guns | only combat troops: 205,962 men 428 machine guns 650 guns |

Casualties and losses
| 20,475 | 46,965 |

The German 9th Army acted versus the Russian armies west of the Vistula River. After the completion of the fighting at Humin and Wola Szydłowska, there was some calm in this sector, especially before the Russian 2nd Army. But, having received the task of pinning down the Russian troops here, the commander of the German 9th Army, General of the Cavalry August von Mackensen, decided by going on the offensive not only to help the Austro-Hungarian troops in the Carpathians, but, if successful, push back Russian 5th Army (Commanding General of Infantry A. Churin, Chief of Staff Major General Thadeus von Sivers) to Warsaw.

== Background ==
The Russian 2nd and 5th Armies of the Northwestern Front, after the start of the fighting near Przasnysz, received the task of ensuring the inviolability of the front on the rivers Pilica, Rawka and Bzura - west of the middle reaches of the Vistula. The bridgehead occupied by the armies from Novogeorgievsk to Nowe Miasto on Pilica covered the junction of the Northwestern and Southwestern fronts on the way to Warsaw and further to the rear of the Russian grouping on the Narew River. After the end of the fighting at Borzymów, Humin and Wola Szydłowska from the 2nd and 5th Armies, the 2nd Siberian, 2nd Caucasian, 1st, 2nd, 5th and 23rd Army Corps were sent to strengthen the 1st, 10th, 12th Armies. Their timely arrival largely decided the outcome of the First battle of Przasnysz in favor of the Russian troops, and during Battle of Łomża did not allow the Germans to develop the counterattacks inflicted into a new successful offensive.

== Battle ==
On February 27, German operational group of cavalry general Rudolf von Frommel was formed as part of the combined division of Major General Karl Dieffenbach from the regiments of the XI Corps, the consolidated brigade of Major General Dietrich Karl Hermann Freiherr von Stein from the 17th and XIII Corps, the reinforced reserve brigade of Major General R. von Zenker, the XXV Reserve Corps (49th and 50th Reserve Sivisions, the consolidated reserve division of Lieutenant General von Menges) and the 9th Cavalry Division. The group was reinforced with heavy artillery - 12 batteries of 150mm howitzers, 4 batteries of 100mm heavy guns, a battery of 210mm mortars.

On March 5, the divisions of Dieffenbach and Menges, the brigades of Stein and Zenker broke through the Russian defenses on the Pilica River in a section of 8 km and began to develop an offensive to the north, cutting off Russian troops from Warsaw. The Germans captured 3,400 prisoners and 20 machine guns. The headquarters of the 5th Army began urgently transferring regiments from the 4th Army Corps to the breakthrough site (1st Rifle Brigade, 2nd Brigade of the 2nd Infantry Division) and brought the 25th Infantry Division into battle; a neighbor from the left flank - the commander of the 4th Army, General of Infantry A. Evert - sent the Germans to the flank from behind the Pilica river of the 18th Infantry Division of the 14th Army Corps.

On March 6, the 5th Army, in which the group of Lieutenant General N. Korotkevich was formed, and the detachment of Lieutenant General P. Papengut from the 4th Army, launched a counterattack and pushed the Germans back, but after the start of attacks on the Russian Grenadier Corps from the German army of Infantry General Remus von Woyrsch near Łopuszno and the resumption of the onslaught of the Frommel group left Żdżary.

On March 7, Korotkevich's detachment was reinforced by militia brigades, the 59th Infantry Division and the 6th Siberian Rifle Division. The Landwehr Corps stopped attacking due to deteriorating weather and lack of ammunition, and from March 8 went on the defensive. To develop the offensive, A. von Mackensen decided to completely transfer the XI, XIII, and XVII Corps to R. von Frommel.

Attempts by the detachments of Korotkevich and Papengut to restore the situation on the Pilica River were unsuccessful. Attempts to advance were thwarted by the dominance of German heavy artillery. On March 8-10, in the battles for Domanevice, all Russian attacks were repulsed by the Germans. On March 1, R. von Frommel's group (G. von Menges's Division, 22nd and 38th Infantry, 9th Cavalry Divisions, X. von Stein's brigade) resumed attacks. The defense of the Russian troops of the 5th Army turned out to be stronger this time: despite the new trophies (in total, during the fighting, the Germans captured 7,150 soldiers and officers and 16 machine guns), the Germans failed to move forward.

The serious situation in the armies of the Southwestern Front in the Carpathians and the failure of attempts to go on the offensive against the German group of von Frommel on the Pilica River was led to the demand of the Commander-in-Chief of the armies of the North-Western Front to the headquarters of the 5th Army to return the detachment of Papengut to the 4th Army. The offensive of the Germans here was already unlikely, only fettering actions were carried out, since the entire supply of shells was used up. The casualties of the von Frommel group reached 10,000 men, including 2,200 killed and 339 captured.

In the battles until March 18, the detachment of Korotkevich lost 36 officers and 3,114 soldiers killed, 7,150 prisoners, 111 officers and 11,744 soldiers wounded, 30 machine guns, several guns. 5 officers and 351 soldiers were taken prisoner. The chief of staff of the 5th Army, Major General N. Sievers, informed the headquarters of the armies of the North-Western Front that the army was moving on to strengthening its positions, not hoping to quickly regain the territory lost at the beginning of the battle. The losses of the 4th Army (a detachment of Papengut and the Grenadier Corps) amounted to 774 killed, 71 missing, 2,709 wounded; the German Landwehr Corps lost 120 killed, 22 missing, 445 wounded. In general, the cessation of active operations on the Pilica River made it possible to transfer the 23rd Infantry Division from the 4th Army to the Carpathians. From the German 9th Army, the 25th and 35th Reserve Divisions were sent to the Carpathians.

On March 21, R. von Frommel stopped the attacks.

== Outcome ==
The battles in March 1915 again showed the approximate equality of forces and the superiority of defense over attack. Having suffered significant losses, the German troops were unable to solve the assigned tasks: to break through the defense of the outnumbered Russian troops or even prevent the transfer of forces from this sector of the front to the Narew River and to the Carpathians. The need to reinforce the Austro-Hungarians in the Carpathians and the armies of the German Eastern Front on the Narew and Bobr rivers forced Hindenburg to significantly weaken the 9th Army.
