= Alexander Ragoza =

Russian-Ukrainian general of the Infantry (1858–1919)

Alexander Frantsevich Ragoza
- Александр Францевич Рагоза
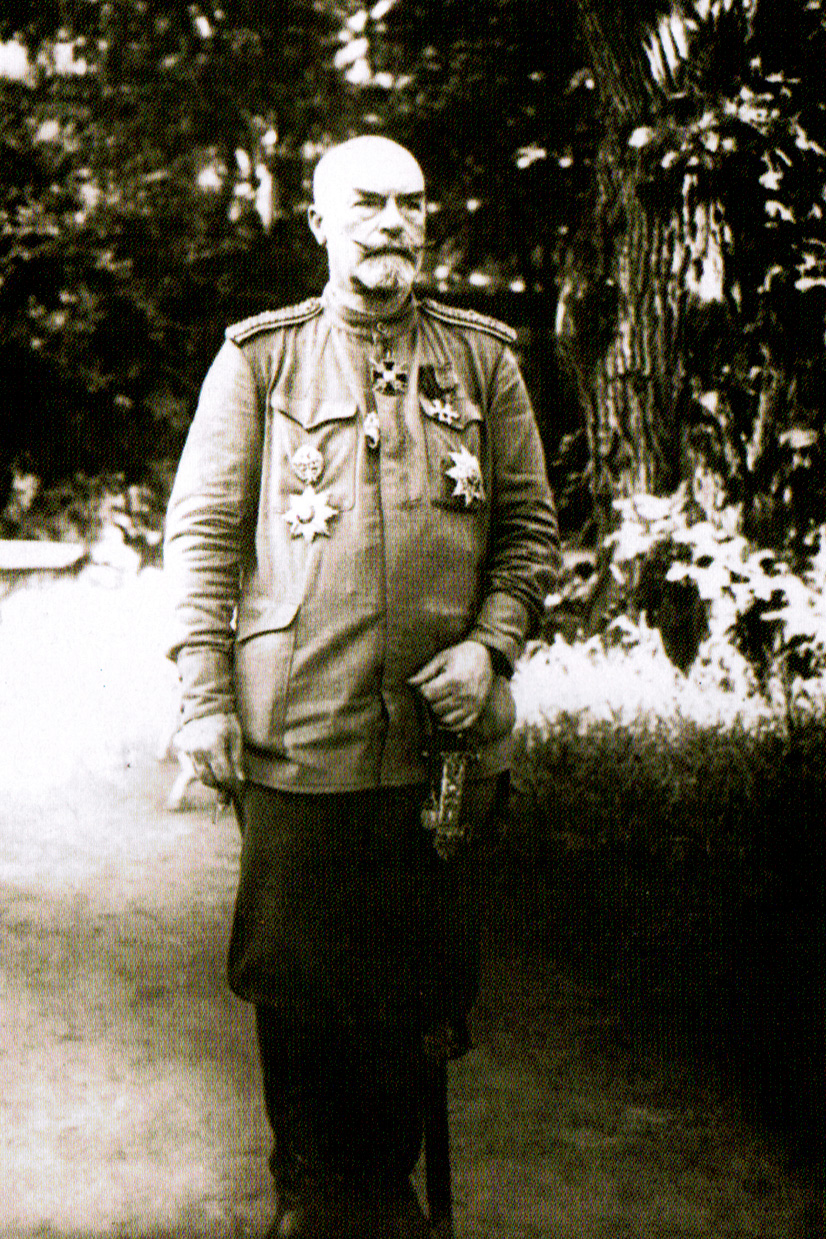
- Ragoza as Minister of War of the Ukrainian State in 1918.

Minister of War
- In office 16 May 1918 – 14 November 1918
- Monarch: Pavlo Skoropadskyi
- Prime Minister: Fedir Lyzohub
- Preceded by: none
- Succeeded by: none

Personal details
- Born: 20 June 1858 Vitebsk Governorate, Russian Empire
- Died: 29 June 1919 (aged 61) Odessa, Ukrainian SSR
- Cause of death: Execution by shooting

Military service
- Allegiance: Russian Empire (1877–1917); Russian Provisional Government (1917); Ukrainian State (1918)
- Branch/service: Imperial Russian Army (1877–1917); Russian Army (1917); Hetmanite Army (1918)
- Years of service: 1877–1918
- Rank: General of the Infantry (Russia); Staff General (Ukrainian State)
- Commands: 18th Vologda Infantry Regiment; 1st Brigade, 27th Infantry Division; Ust-Dvinsk Fortress; 19th Infantry Division; 25th Army Corps; 4th Army; 2nd Army; Romanian Front; 4th Ukrainian Army
- Battles/wars: Russo-Turkish War; World War I; Eastern Front; Lake Naroch Offensive; Baranovichi Offensive; Romanian Campaign; Battle of Râmnicu Sărat; Battle of Mărășești; Russian Civil War
- Awards: Order of Saint Anna; Order of Saint Stanislaus; Order of Saint Vladimir; Order of the White Eagle; Order of St. George; Order of Saint Alexander Nevsky; Order of Michael the Brave

Alexander Frantsevich Ragoza (Russian: Александр Францевич Рагоза; 20 June [O.S. 8 June] 1858 – 29 June 1919), also known as Oleksandr Frantsevych Rohoza (Ukrainian: Олександр Францевич Рогоза), was a Russian general of the infantry during World War I, and Minister of Defense of the Ukrainian State.

== Biography ==
Born on 20 June (O.S. 8 June) 1858 in Vitebsk Governorate, Ragoza was the eldest son of Franz Martynovich Ragosa, a military officer from the governorate's hereditary nobility. Following the example of his father, he chose a military career and entered the Polotsk military gymnasium, continuing his education at the Mikhailovsky Artillery School after 1874.

Posted to the 3rd Guards Grenadier Artillery Brigade immediately after completing his studies, Ragoza received his baptism of fire immediately after graduation at the front during the Russo-Turkish War of 1877-1878. On account of his bravery in combat, the young officer was awarded the Order of Saint Anna Fourth Class, the Order of Saint Stanislaus Third Class and Second Class with Swords, and the Order of Saint Anna Third Class with Swords and Bow.

In 1883, Ragoza graduated from the Nikolaev General Staff Academy. On 22 November 1883, he became the senior adjutant of the headquarters of the 5th Infantry Division, and on 11 January 1888 he became assistant to the senior adjutant of the headquarters of the Amur Military District. On 1 July 1888 he became senior adjutant to the military chancellery under the military governor of the Primorsky Region, and on 30 August 1888 he was promoted to lieutenant colonel. On 28 January 1891 he took charge of the combat department of the headquarters of the Kerch Fortress, and he was promoted to colonel on 30 August 1892. On 4 September 1896 he became chief of staff of the 32nd Infantry Division, and on 10 March 1898 he took up the position of chief of staff of the 5th Infantry Division.

On 27 April 1900, Ragoza took command of the 18th Vologda Infantry Regiment. He was promoted to major general on 2 March 1904, he became commanding officer of the 1st Brigade of the 27th Infantry Division the same day 1904. On 22 October 1904 he was appointed chief of staff of the 3rd Army Corps, and on 16 June 1906 he became commandant of the Ust-Dvinsk fortress. He received a promotion to lieutenant general on 13 April 1908. On 17 March 1909 he took command of the 19th Infantry Division.

=== World War I ===
When the Russian Empire entered World War I on 1 August 1914, Ragoza was still in command of the 19th Infantry Division. On 27 September 1914, Ragoza — by then a lieutenant general — became commander of the 25th Army Corps, a part of the 9th Army. He led the corps in the Battle of the Vistula River in September–October 1914. On 6 December 1914, he was promoted to general of the infantry. At the head of the 25th Army Corps, he distinguished himself during the battles of Vilkolaz and Urzhendov in late June 1915, when a counterattack by the corps defeated the Austro-Hungarian Army's 4th Army commanded by Archduke Joseph Ferdinand of Austria. He received the Order of Saint Vladimir Second Class with Swords, the Order of the White Eagle with Swords, and the Order of St. George Fourth Class.

The Imperial Russian Army conducted a strategic withdrawal — the Great Retreat — from Poland to Byelorussia between July and September 1915 and created the Western Front with headquarters at Minsk. After the completion of the withdrawal, Ragoza was appointed to the post of commander of the 4th Army, which was part of the Western Front, on 20 September 1915. For more than a year thereafter, Ragoza's military operations were associated with his native region. Under his command, the 4th Army clung tightly to Baranavichy, and the front in the region became static for two years, with all German attempts to push their forces closer to Minsk in vain. On 6 October 1915, Ragoza was awarded the Order of Saint Alexander Nevsky with Swords.

In March 1916, when the commander of the 2nd Army, General of the Infantry Vladimir Vasilyevich Smirnov, fell ill, Ragoza took command of the 2nd Army as well as the 4th Army. Under Ragoza's command, the 2nd Army was assigned the main blow of the Russian Lake Naroch Offensive. Ragoza divided the 2nd Army into three groups and a reserve. The right-flank group under General of Cavalry Mikhail Mikhailovich Pleshkov consisted of the 1st Siberian Army Corps under Pleshkov himself, the 1st Army Corps under General of the Infantry Alexander Alexandrovich Dushkevich, the 27th Army Corps under General of the Infantry Dmitri Balanin; the central group under the command of General of the Infantry Leonid-Otto Sirelius consisted of the 4th Siberian Army Corps under Sirelius himself and the 34th Army Corps under General of the Infantry F. M. Webel; the left-flank group under General of the Infantry Pyotr Baluyev consisted of the 5th Army Corps under Baluev himself, the 3rd Siberian Army Corps under Lieutenant General V. O. Trofimov, and the 25th Army Corps under Lieutenant General Pavel Parchevsky; and the reserve consisted of the 3rd Caucasian Army Corps under General of the Artillery V. A. Irman, 15th Army Corps under Lieutenant General Fyodor Torklus, and the 36th Army Corps under Lieutenant General N. N. Korotkevich. On 18 March (O.S. 5 March) 1916, the Lake Naroch Offensive began. The Pleshkov and Sirelius groups, having suffered huge losses, did not succeed. Only Bulaev's group achieved some success. On 28 March (O.S. 15 March) 1916, due to heavy losses and a lack of results, the Lake Naroch Offensive halted after the 2nd Army had suffered 90,000 casualties, including about 20,000 killed, and the opposing German 10th Army suffered about 10,000 casualties. In April 1916, Ragoza relinquished command of the 2nd Army to General Smirnov, who had returned to the front.

Ragoza remained in command of the 4th Army, which in the first half of November 1916 was transferred from Byelorussia to Wallachia on the Romanian front. With the 4th, 7th, 8th, 19th, and 30th Army Corps under its control, Ragoza's 4th Army waged heavy defensive battles on the Râmnicul Sărat river in December 1916. On 18 December 1916, the Imperial German Army made an unsuccessful attempt to break through at the junction of the Russian 4th and 9th Armies in the Putna Valley. On 24 December 1916, the German 9th Army struck in the Râmnicu Sărat area. During the four-day battle that followed, Ragoza's 8th and 30th Army Corps withstood the blow, but Ragoza was forced to withdraw his army after it suffered about 40,000 casualties, including 10,000 captured.

After the February Revolution in 1917, Ragoza was one of the few senior military leaders of the former Imperial Russian Army who retained the post of commander in the post-revolution Russian Army of the Russian Republic under the new Russian Provisional Government. During March and April 1917, he temporarily commanded the Russian Army's Romanian Front, with the Romanian First and Second Armies among the forces subordinate to him. The King of Romania, Ferdinand I, recognized Ragoza's achievements by awarding him the Order of Michael the Brave Third Class. Ragoza remained in command of the 4th Army after it was redesignated the 4th Ukrainian Army in August 1917.

Before the Romanian Army′s summer 1917 offensive, Ragoza's 4th Army was stationed in the Șușița Valley. The plan for the offensive called for Rogoza's army to provide support to the Romanian 1st Army, which was to advance in the foothills of the Carpathian Mountains. On 24 July 1917, the offensive began, with a component of Ragoza's army — General Pyotr Lomnovsky's 8th Army Corps — pushing back German forces. On 25 July 1917, Minister-Chairman of the Russian Provisional Government, Alexander Kerensky, issued an order canceling the operation. On 6 August 1917, German troops attacked the positions of the 4th Army and defeated the 12th Army Corps, which suffered the loss of about 3,000 men captured and 17 guns), but were stopped by artillery fire. This German success forced Ragoza to divert the 12th Army Corps to Siret, and the 8th Army Corps to Șușița. In the Battle of Mărășești, the 13th and 71st Infantry Divisions of the 4th Army's 6th Army Corps repulsed a German attack on Mărășești. On 9 August 9, 1917, Ragoza launched a counteroffensive in which his 8th Army Corps pushed back an Imperial German Army force under the command of General Weninger, and his 7th Army Corps joined Romanian troops driving back German troops under General Morgen. On 11 August 1917, German troops launched another attack at Panciu, driving on Mărășești. The blow was repulsed. Ragoza turned over the front to General Eremia Grigorescu's Romanian 1st Army, which replaced the Russian 8th Army Corps. On 13 August 1917, as conditions deteriorated for his troops, Ragoza ordered the evacuation of Mărășești. Grigorescu refused to comply, so Russian General of the Infantry Dmitry Shcherbachev, the deputy commander of Allied forces on the Romanian front, handed over the Mărășești sector to Grigorescu, including the Russian 8th Army Corps, and the rest of the 4th Army was transferred to northern Moldavia. In the Battle of Mărășești, Ragoza's 4th Army, which had begun with 70,000 men, lost 45,000 men, including about 5,000 captured.

=== October Revolution and Russian Civil War ===
After the October Revolution of 1917, the Bolshevik Military Revolutionary Committee removed Ragoza from command of the 4th Army on 21 November 1917. Following the February Revolution of 1917, the Ukrainian People's Republic had declared its independence in June 1917, but an April 1918 coup d'etat under the supervision of the German Empire toppled that regime and replaced it with an anti-Bolshevik dictatorship under Hetman of Ukraine Pavlo Skoropadskyi, who outlawed all socialist political parties, established a new Ukrainian State, and created an anti-Bolshevik front. Ragoza in April 1918 became the highest-ranking officer — a general bunchuzhnyi, or "staff general", equivalent to a field marshal — in the Ukrainian State's army, the Hetmanite Army, and he joined the Skoropadskyi government as its minister of war in May 1918. Within the structure of the Hetmanate, Ragoza has been described as representative of a "pro-Russian" faction which intended to put Ukraine in the center of the movement to remove the Bolsheviks from power in Russia. This, at the same time, would secure for Kiev the central position in the "gathering" of Russia.

In his capacity as minister of war in Skoropadskyi's cabinet Ragoza worked to organize an army for the new state, consisting of eight infantry corps, reestablished the Ukrainian Cossacks as a component of the army, recruited numerous officers of many ethnicities from the old Imperial Russian Army to serve in the Hetmanite Army, and introduced Ukrainian as the new army's language. He raised a corps and three divisions during his tenure. However, when Germany withdrew its support after the signing of the armistice that ended World War I, Skoropadskyi's government fell, and on November 14 Ragoza's tenure as minister of war ended.

After the restoration of the Ukrainian People's Republic Ragoza declined to join its army. Subsequently, on 15 December 1918, he was arrested in Kiev on the orders of the Directorate, but he was soon released. Shortly after that Ragoza left the Ukrainian capital for Odessa, where units loyal to the Volunteer Army, as well as troops from the interventionist powers, were stationed. His goal was to proceed further toward the Kuban and join the Whites to fight against the Bolsheviks, but while he managed to reach Odessa, he did not succeed in linking up with the anti-Bolshevik forces in time: in March 1919 Odessa was seized by troops under the command of ataman Nykyfor Hryhoriv, who was fighting under the Red banner at the time, and general Ragoza was promptly arrested. After he refused an offer to join the Bolshevik forces, he was executed on 29 June 1919 in Odessa's Catherine Square.

== Awards and honors ==
=== Russian ===
- Order of Saint Anna, Fourth Class
- Order of Saint Stanislaus, Third Class
- Order of Saint Anna, Third Class, with Swords and Bow
- Order of Saint Vladimir, Second Class, with Swords
- Order of the White Eagle with Swords
- Order of St. George, Fourth Class
- Order of Saint Alexander Nevsky, Fourth Class

=== Foreign ===
- Order of Michael the Brave (Kingdom of Romania)
