= Battle of the Four Rivers =

World War I battle

- Part of The Eastern front of the World War I
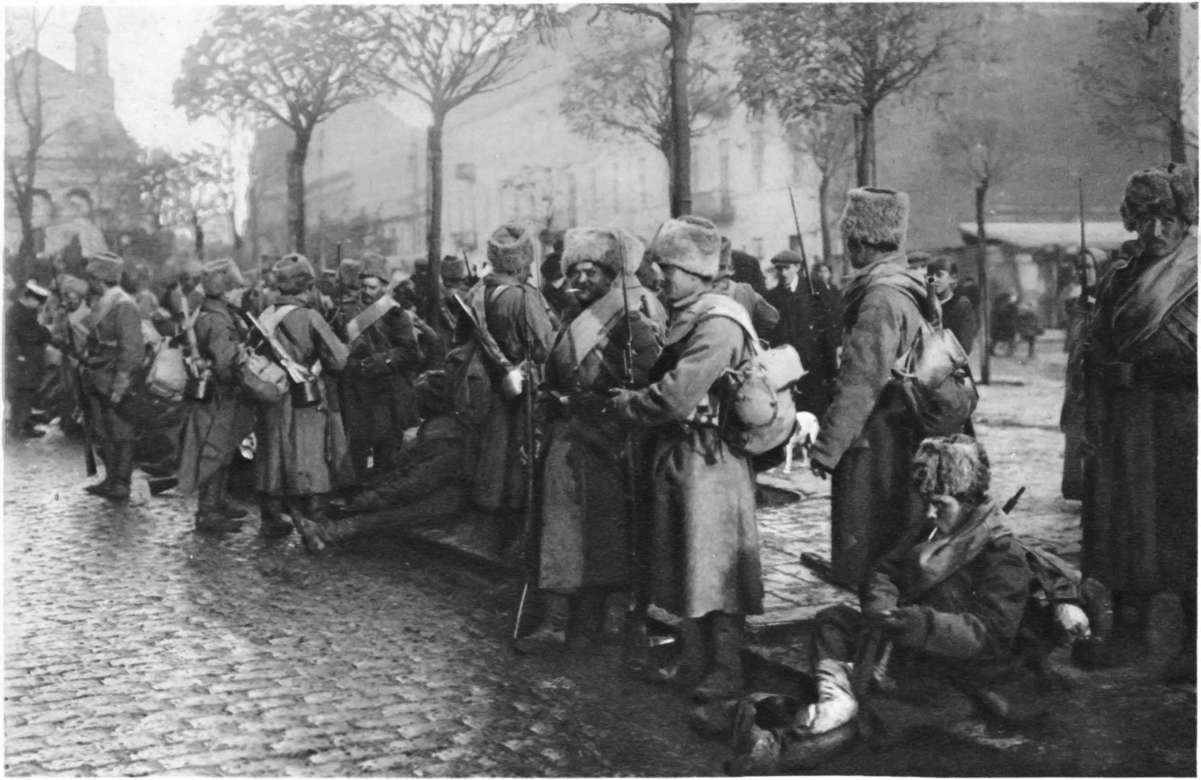
- Siberian riflemen in Warsaw in December 1914
Date	16 December–16 January [O.S. 3 December–3 January] 1914–1915
Location	near Warsaw, Congress Poland, Russian Empire (now Poland)
Result	Russian victory
Territorial changes	Central Powers offensive to Warsaw halted

Belligerents
German Empire; Austria-Hungary	Russian Empire

Commanders and leaders
(German Empire) Paul von Hindenburg (Austria-Hungary) Viktor Dankl von Krasnik (German Empire) Remus von Woyrsch (Austria-Hungary) Eduard von Böhm-Ermolli	Nikolai Ruzsky; Alexander Litvinov; Vladimir Smirnov; Aleksei Evert; Paul von Plehwe; Platon Lechitsky

Units involved
(German Empire) 9th Army (Austria-Hungary) 1st Army (Austria-Hungary) 2nd Army (German Empire) Landwehr Corps	1st Army; 2nd Army; 4th Army; 5th Army; 9th Army

The Battle of the Four Rivers (Russian: Сражение на четырех реках) or Battles on the Bzura, Rawka, Pilica and Nida was a key battle between German and Russian forces in the First World War in 1914, in which the Germans unsuccessfully tried to break through and take Warsaw. The battle was the first positional battle on the eastern front, and was one of the bloodiest battles in 1914.

== Background ==
Germans tried to encircle three Russian armies in Poland in November 1914, but did not succeed due to huge losses, the size of the territories, and the Russians' retreat to Warsaw. By this time, enough reinforcements had arrived from the western front, and the central powers were preparing to make a breakthrough in order to capture this city.

== Forces ==
According to the regimental reports of both countries, the 5th Army with a total of 500,000 men took part on the Russian side, the total forces on the German side were 600,000,; the 9th Army alone had 305,576 men, and formed the backbone of the operation. Each of the Russian armies had about 100,000 men due to heavy losses in the previous battle.

== Battle ==
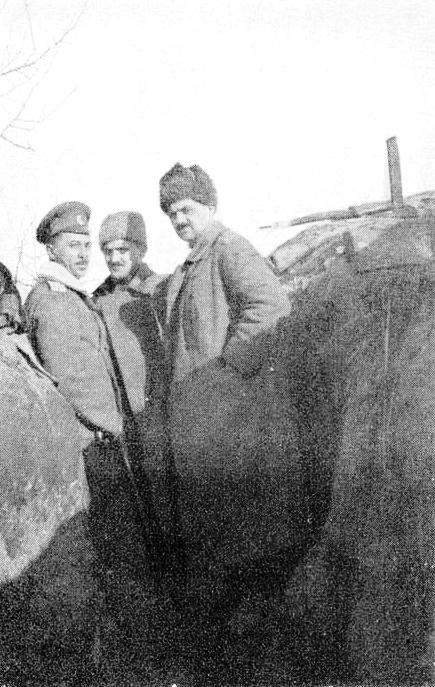
Russian officers on Bzura

=== German offensive ===
In the beginning the Germans successfully pushed back the Russians in small groups.

On December 18, the Germans unexpectedly struck from the side of Łowicz. However, when it came to crossing the Rawka, problems arose, two German regiments were able to successfully do this, however, at the time of the crossing they suffered incredibly heavy losses and were scattered and thrown back across the river by the counterattack of the 1st Siberian Army Corps. On the Bzura front, the Germans achieved minimal success and instead of completely securing the river, they were able to equip several positions, at which point the Russian retreat ended, the general stage of the battle began.

=== Main stage of Battle ===
On December 19, a meeting of the central powers took place in Oppeln, a debate broke out between Konrad and Falkenhayn about actions, as a result, they came to the conclusion that by maintaining such a heat of battle on both fronts, they risk losing the chance to win the war, so they need to immediately occupy Russian-held Poland.

On December 20, the offensive continued using supernova heavy artillery, the Germans ensured local success, the Russian positions on Rawka were demoralized, but not broken through, the Germans captured 2,100 people in a day.

There was progress, but it was incredibly slowed down by the "infernal" persistence of the Russians.

On December 21, the German attacks did not stop, there were two significant events: the attack on the Wola Szydłowiecka, which ended with the retreat of the Germans, and the battle of Inowłódz, in which a Russian brigade was surrounded; 3,000 soldiers were captured.

Germans were incredibly exhausted by December 24, as a result of these battles, 29,458 Russians were captured, but the price of these trophies was very high; on the same day, the Austrians tried to force Nida, the Russians specifically allowed them to do this, and then attacked the cut-off troops with huge forces, 10,000 Austro-Hungarian soldiers were captured.

A similar case occurred at Sochaczew, where 15,000 crossed the river, but were covered with heavy fire and by nightfall the remnants in the form of 8,000 surrendered.

On December 25, the fighting almost stopped, but the artillery duels continued.

== Result ==
The battle ended with Russia's victory All attempts by the Germans to push the Russians back over the Vistula and even approach Warsaw ended in failure, this battle also affected the outcome of the Battle of Ypres, by the end of the battle the number of the German army was 200,000.

Russian casualties were 150,000-200,000, and for the central powers 120,000. The main reason for this was the heavy artillery of Germany, which caused very great damage to the Russians.
