= Second Battle of Bolimów =

Battle in 1915 during the First World War

- Part of the Eastern Front of World War I
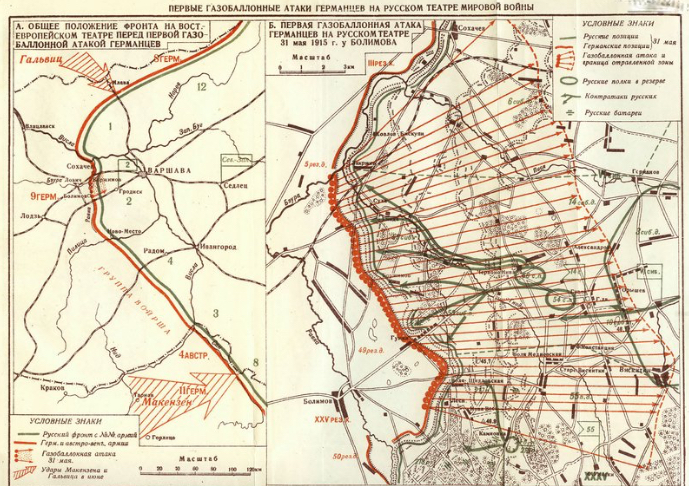
- German gas attacks near Bolimow on 31 May 1915
Date	31 May – 7 July 1915
Location	Near Bolimów, Congress Poland, Russian Empire (present-day Poland)
Result	Russian victory
Territorial changes	German offensive to Warsaw halted

Belligerents
German Empire	Russian Empire

Commanders and leaders
(German Empire) Paul von Hindenburg (German Empire) Erich Ludendorff	Vladimir Smirnov

Units involved
(German Empire) 9th Army	2nd Army

Strength
296,303	307,702

Casualties and losses
7,109	46,310: 17,907 to 22,459 from gas

The Second Battle of Bolimów was a battle of World War I between the Imperial German Army and Imperial Russian Army. The Germans, using poison gases, inflicted heavy losses on the Russian troops, but could not use the success and limited themselves to minimal acquisitions.

Russian's fierce resistance thwarted the German headquarters' attempts to encircle the Russians in Poland and allowed the latter to set up defensive positions to which they would have to withdraw as a result of the great retreat.

== Background ==
In the spring of 1915, The German command, together with the actions of the southern group, planned to attack Warsaw, as it was in December 1914 during the Battle of the Four Rivers.

Simultaneously with the large-scale offensive near Gorlice, in other sectors of the Eastern Front, the German command planned a number of smaller offensive operations that pursued their strategic goals and solved their operational problems. One of these areas where the offensive was planned was the Bolimów sector. The “sector” arose in December 1914 – January 1915. Then the German command set a priority task for its troops: to defeat parts of the Russian 2nd Army in the Warsaw direction in the area of the lower reaches of the Rawka River, and, having entered the operational space, create an immediate threat of the capture of Warsaw, to which no more than 60 kilometers remained from these positions in a straight line. During the bloody and stubborn battles, the Germans failed to break through the front, but they still managed to break into the Russian defense, and, having captured bridgeheads on the right bank of the Rawka River in the Bolimów area, gain a foothold on them, this is how the “Bolimów sector” arose. During the January battles of 1915, the German command used chemical weapons on a large scale for the first time in the “sector,” dropping 18,000 shells filled with the irritating chemical xylyl bromide on Russian positions near Gumin and Wola Szydłowska on January 31, 1915.

The strategic importance of the “Bolimów sector” for both warring parties was obvious. From the positions captured by the Germans on the Rawka River, the shortest route to Warsaw opened up. In general, the operational situation that developed in this sector of the front fully corresponded to the strategic plan of the command of the German 9th Army, to conduct a decisive attack on Warsaw here. However, despite all the obvious tactical and operational benefits, it was extremely difficult for German troops to make a breakthrough in the Bolimów sector, because the Russian command, understanding the threat of a breakthrough in this direction, saturated this section of the front with troops, and also during the winter and spring 1915 created and continued to create fortified positions throughout the entire depth of the operational defense, which extended far to the east and ended at Błonie, 15-20 kilometers and at Piaseczno, 5-8 kilometers west and southwest of Warsaw. The task of breaking through the Russian defense in the “Bolimów sector” for the German 9th Army was made even more difficult due to the transfer of reserves from its composition to Gorlice and East Prussia, which weakened the striking power of the army. And yet, the commander of the 9th Army, Prince Leopold of Bavaria, having at his disposal two and a half army corps, decided to strike in the “Bolimów sector”, break through the front and, crushing the Russian's defenses, continue the offensive with the goal of capturing Warsaw. The striking power of the missing divisions, according to the commander of the German 9th Army, should have been replaced by chemical weapons - chlorine. However, subsequent events showed that the numerical superiority of the Russians negated the success of the use of poison gases.

The deadly power of chlorine was supposed to destroy not only large masses of Russian manpower, but also solve other equally important and primary tasks, namely, to stun and demoralize the Russian Imperial Army, to suppress its will to resist. Therefore, the command of the German 9th Army believed that it had concentrated sufficient forces in the zone of the upcoming breakthrough that would be able to break into the defense of the Russian 2nd Army, weakened by human losses, after the use of gas.

=== Preparation for battle ===
Based on the established concept of the planned operation, at the beginning of May 1915, the German command transferred the 36th Pioneer Regiment to positions near Bolimov. This was a special unit trained to carry out gas attacks. On May 18, 1915, the regiment began installing gas cylinders in forward positions. A total of 12,000 cylinders filled with chlorine with a 5% phosgene composition were delivered. Due to the huge number of cylinders and due to the short preparation time for the attack, soldiers of the infantry regiments helped install the cylinders. The cylinders were placed on a 12-kilometer section of the front in the trenches of the 36th, 35th Infantry and 49th Reserve Divisions of the German Imperial Army, which occupied positions from the confluence of the Sukha River into the Bzura River in the north, where the village of Zakrzew was located, and further south along broken line: Zakrzew – Borzymów – Gumin – Wola Szydłowiecka – forester's house. Starting from Bzura and further south, the trenches were occupied by the following German units, in the Zakrzew - Gumin sector: 2nd Battalion of the 48th Reserve Infantry Regiment, 1st Battalion of the 52nd Reserve Infantry Regiment, 175th Infantry Regiment, 5th Grenadier Regiment, 128th Infantry Regiment, 61st Infantry Regiment, 176th Infantry Regiment. South of Gumin: 226th Reserve Infantry Regiment, 225th Reserve Infantry Regiment, 21st Reserve Rifle Battalion and 228th Reserve Infantry Regiment.

In this sector, the 2nd Army held the defense on the Russian side. From Zakrzhev to Gumin these were units of the 14th Siberian Rifle Division from the 6th Siberian Corps: from north to south, the positions were occupied by the 55th and 53rd Siberian Rifle Regiments. The remaining two regiments of the division were in reserve: the 56th Siberian Rifle Regiment (divisional reserve), the 54th Siberian Rifle Regiment (army reserve). South of Gumin the defense was held by the 55th Infantry Division from the 35th Army Corps. From north to south, the 217th Kovrovsky was located there and the 218th Gorbatovsky Infantry Regiment. To the south of the forester's house, the defense was held by the 220th Skopinsky Infantry Regiment with three militia squads attached to it. During the chemical attack carried out by the Germans on May 31, the squads found themselves, in fact, outside the affected area of the poisonous gases. By May 22, all cylinders filled with chlorine were installed at the forward positions of the German troops and were ready for use. The start of the gas attack was planned for May 23, but the wind did not blow on the positions of the Russian army, and in anticipation of a change in wind direction, the attack was postponed to May 31, 1915.

== Battle ==
=== First battle on 31 May ===
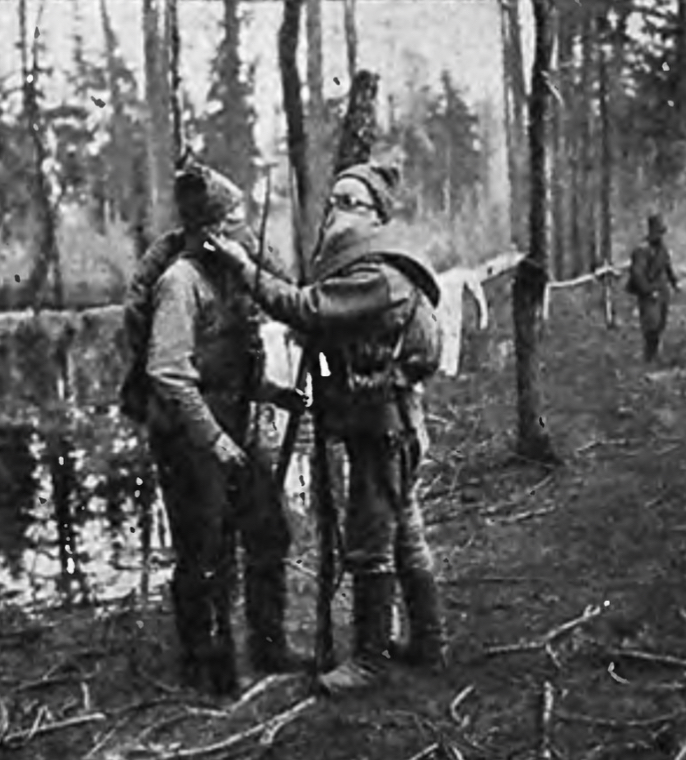
Russian soldiers dress up in anti-gas equipment

At 3:30 a.m. on May 31, 1915, in the German frontline trenches, in which there were 12,000 cylinders of lethal gas, the telephone rang and a voice was heard on the receiver that said only one word: “Wittelsbach”. This was a prearranged signal for the start of the gas attack. At 3:45 am, soldiers of the 36th Pioneer Regiment of the German Army opened the taps in chlorine cylinders. At the same time, shelling of Russian positions began with artillery, machine guns and small arms. The chlorine was carried by the wind to Russian positions, which were defended by units of the 14th Siberian Rifle Division (6th Siberian Corps) and the 55th Infantry Division (35th Army Corps). During the gas attack, the Germans failed to break through the front. Although the Russian units suffered critical losses from chlorine poisoning, they still managed, with the help of arriving reserves, to repel numerous German attacks. There were 9 such attacks in total, and despite the fact that the Russians lost 75% of their personnel in the advanced positions, the German attacks were not successful anywhere and the Germans quickly retreated to their starting positions in order to avoid losses. Not even a single minimal tactical task was completed, and progress since the beginning of the fighting went rather in a negative direction, soon the Germans tried to repeat the offensive.

During the chemical attack on May 31, German soldiers were also poisoned with chlorine. In the 225th Reserve Infantry Regiment, when opening the valves, it turned out that some of the cylinders had a technological defect: there was no seal in the connection between the cylinder itself and the socket attached to it. As soon as the soldiers of the 36th Pioneer Regiment began to open the valves of the cylinders to release the chlorine, the gas began to flow from the depressurized joints and quickly spread throughout the trenches. Several cylinders fell, dragging into the trench and spouts from which clouds of chlorine poured out. In total, during the chemical attack on May 31, 1915, 56 German soldiers were poisoned. The Germans' total losses during the battle amounted to 374 men.

The Russian troops lost much more, about 10,856, of which 1,400 died. Of these losses, 9,000 were due to gas exposure, not as a result of fighting.

=== Second battle on 12 June ===
On the night of June 12, Prince Leopold of Bavaria ordered a repeat gas attack. Preparations were reduced as Russian troops launched nightly attacks to recapture lost sections of the position, but the number of heavy batteries increased to 24. The release of gas followed an hour's artillery preparation at 3.30. but a changing wind carried the cloud to the German trenches. The launch was cancelled, only 4,500 cylinders were emptied. The infantry attack was launched at 5 o'clock; by 8 o'clock the Russian positions were in the villages: Zakrzhev, Kornelin, Zhilin and Kozlov-Biskupy were captured, the Germans entrenched themselves on the embankment of the Warsaw-Vienna Railway and on June 12–13 held the occupied space, repelling all counterattacks. Despite this, the German command was extremely dissatisfied with the result of the attacks, despite some tactical success, not a Single unit completed its tasks and the Russian defense was still impregnable.

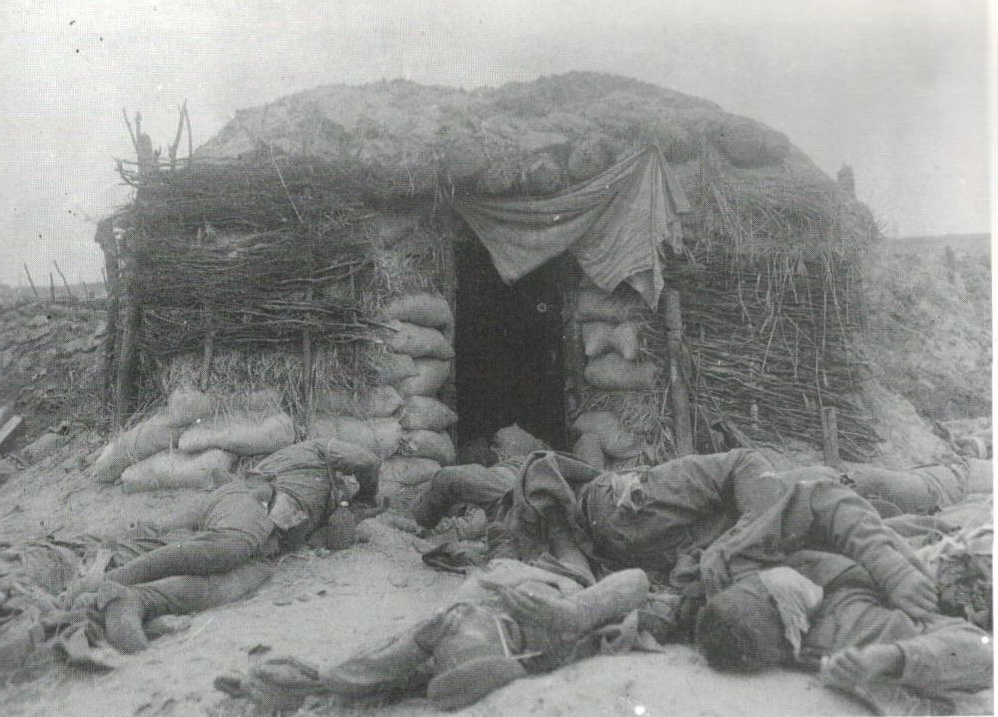
Russian soldiers who poisoned by chlorine

The Germans captured 1,600 prisoners and 8 machine guns; in a 6 km area the breakthrough in depth reached 2–3 km. Despite the supply of German soldiers with protective bandages and decontamination solutions, German losses by poisoning reached 350 men (out of a total loss of 1,100). Russian troops at the line of attack lost 327 killed, 2,571 missing, 2,923 wounded. The physical impact of the gases was not as great as during the first attack, as a result 50 men died, 19 officers and 2,359 soldiers were poisoned (or 2,285 poisoned of which 73 died), but the psychological effect exceeded the German's expectations: Russian soldiers abandoned part of the position and fled at the sight of the gas cloud.

=== Third battle on 6-7 July ===
The headquarters of the German 9th Army began preparations for a new chemical attack. But this time, Russian troops took countermeasures, striking at night at enemy positions where gas launchers could be located. However, 3,000 gas cylinders were buried in the 8th and 12th Reserve Infantry Regiments' sectors. Unfavorable weather on the nights of June 17 and 19 prevented the Germans from carrying out new chemical attacks. Two sections were planned: from the village of Leonov to the mouth of the Pisya River and at Borzhimov. On July 6, the gases were launched only at Borzhimov; the wind changed from east to north, and the gas cloud not only lingered in the trenches captured by the Germans, but also penetrated the positions of the 5th Reserve Division, forcing it to retreat to Zakrzhev. The Germans lost about 1,400 poisoned people because of this, of which 300 died.

Significant losses in the regiments that were subjected to a gas attack on the night of July 6–7, as well as the abandonment of their positions by the companies of the 21st Siberian and 218th Gorbatovsky regiments during the passage of the gas wave, forced the command of the 2nd Army to throw not only reserves into the resulting gap from the 35th Corps, but also parts of neighboring formations. As a result, battalions of the 117th Yaroslavl Infantry and 120th Serpukhov Infantry Regiments from the 30th Infantry Division of the 4th Army Corps, which temporarily became subordinate to the 35th Army Corps, took part in eliminating the resulting breakthrough, together with the 220th Skopinsky Regiment. Some of the personnel of these regiments also suffered from gas poisoning.

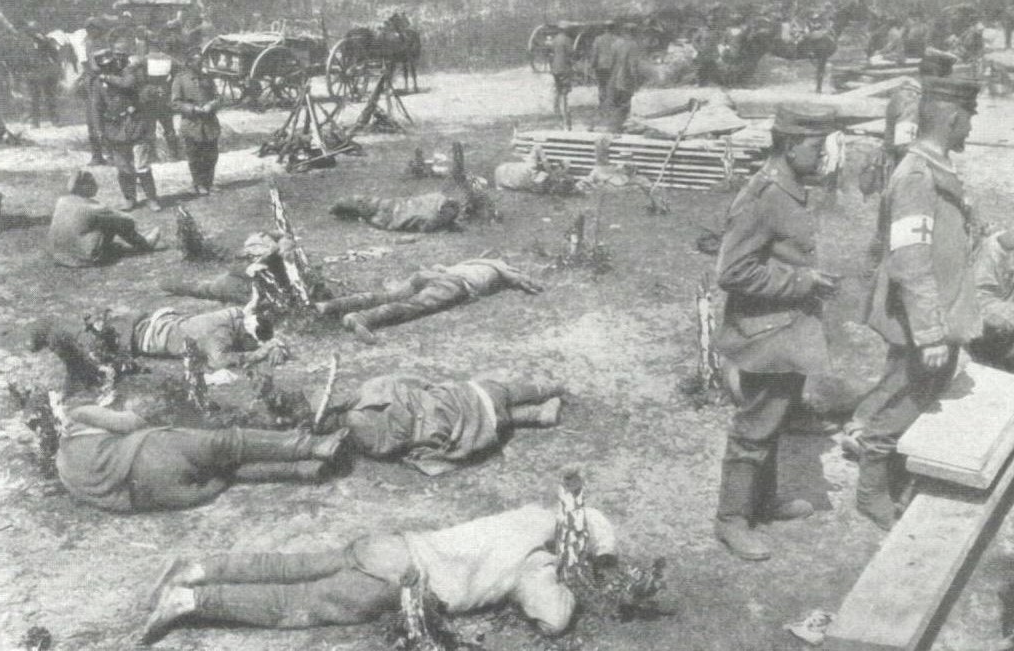
June 12, 1915 the Bolimov sector. Russian soldiers who died from chlorine, whose corpses were transferred by the Germans to their rear.

In this attack, Her Majesty Alexandra Feodorovna's 21st Siberian Regiment distinguished itself the most, which was one of the first to be gassed and even so continued to resist, defending the advanced positions. This event was sanctified in the Russian press as a feat of «civilization against the barbaric methods of war».

During the new attack, the Russians suffered heavy losses, but the data on them vary. Sergey Nelipovich estimates the losses of Russians on this day at 7,688 of which 1,870 died. Nikolay Postnikov raises data on losses to 10,010 of which 1,775 died.

== Outcome ==
=== Result of battle ===
Even though the Russians suffered very heavy losses, german troops made only minor progress, not completing the tasks set. The fierce resistance of the Russian troops doomed the German command to failure. A German soldier reflected a remarkable case that a Russian officer during the gas attacks, instead of retreating, took up a shooting position and fired at the Germans to the last, even after death he did not let go of the rifle. General Falkenhayn was forced to state that operations against the Warsaw salient were not producing the desired result and that the German advance was difficult due to fierce resistance on their way.

According to calculations by Sergei Nelipovich and Nikolai Postnikov Russian troops lost 46,310 people, of whom 5,196 (Note: 1,800 in battle) died, 4,603 were missing and 36,511 (Note: 17,907 to 22,459 affected by gas) were injured. German troops lost much less at that time, about 7,109 people, of whom 2,423 died, 262 were missing and 4,294 were wounded.

=== Russian reaction to the attack ===
The psychological effect of the use of chemical weapons on the personnel and command of units of the Russian army was enormous. The experience of these attacks could not be ignored. The head of the “Commission to clarify the conditions of the use of asphyxiating gases by the Germans on the night of June 23–24 of this year in the area where the 5th Siberian and 35th Army Corps were located and the results of their use,” Major General Pavlov wrote:

I consider it my duty to report that the highest The commanding staff of the 5th Siberian Corps and the 35th Army Corps verbally and in written explanations, as well as all the officers of the 21st Siberian Rifle and 218th Gorbatov Infantry Regiments, expressed to me and the members of the commission in the most categorical form that:

- a) moral the effect of poisonous gases on our troops, in the absence of the same measures of influence on our part, is extremely strong; how truly was the stunning impression of defenselessness, the impossibility of either resistance or struggle and the useless death of people - can be illustrated by the fact, certified by the commander of the 21st Siberian Rifle Regiment, the suicide in the trenches of two company commanders: the 14th company of Khlopitsky and the 15th company of Kardopoltsev; the proven courage and valor of the officers of this regiment were known and proven in previous battles, therefore the suicide of such officers can only be explained by unbearable mental and partly physical suffering;
- b) if the sacrifices of thousands of lives made on our part remain unpunished for the Germans and there is no retribution for them with the same weapons and our defenselessness continues, then this could have a detrimental effect on the spirit of our troops and even lead to their demoralization, and
- c) the use of poisonous gases from our side will be accepted with delight by everyone, and even if we have losses from enemy gases, they will be considered the inevitable consequences of battle, as from rifle and machine-gun fire, where both sides use the same weapons; Therefore, our use of gases is extremely necessary, but under the indispensable condition that their quantity and effect are by no means weaker than German gases.”

After that, a commission was established to combat toxic substances in order to minimize damage from such actions by the German army.
