= Vladimir Smirnov (general) =

Imperial Russian Army general of the infantry

Vladimir Vasilyevich Smirnov
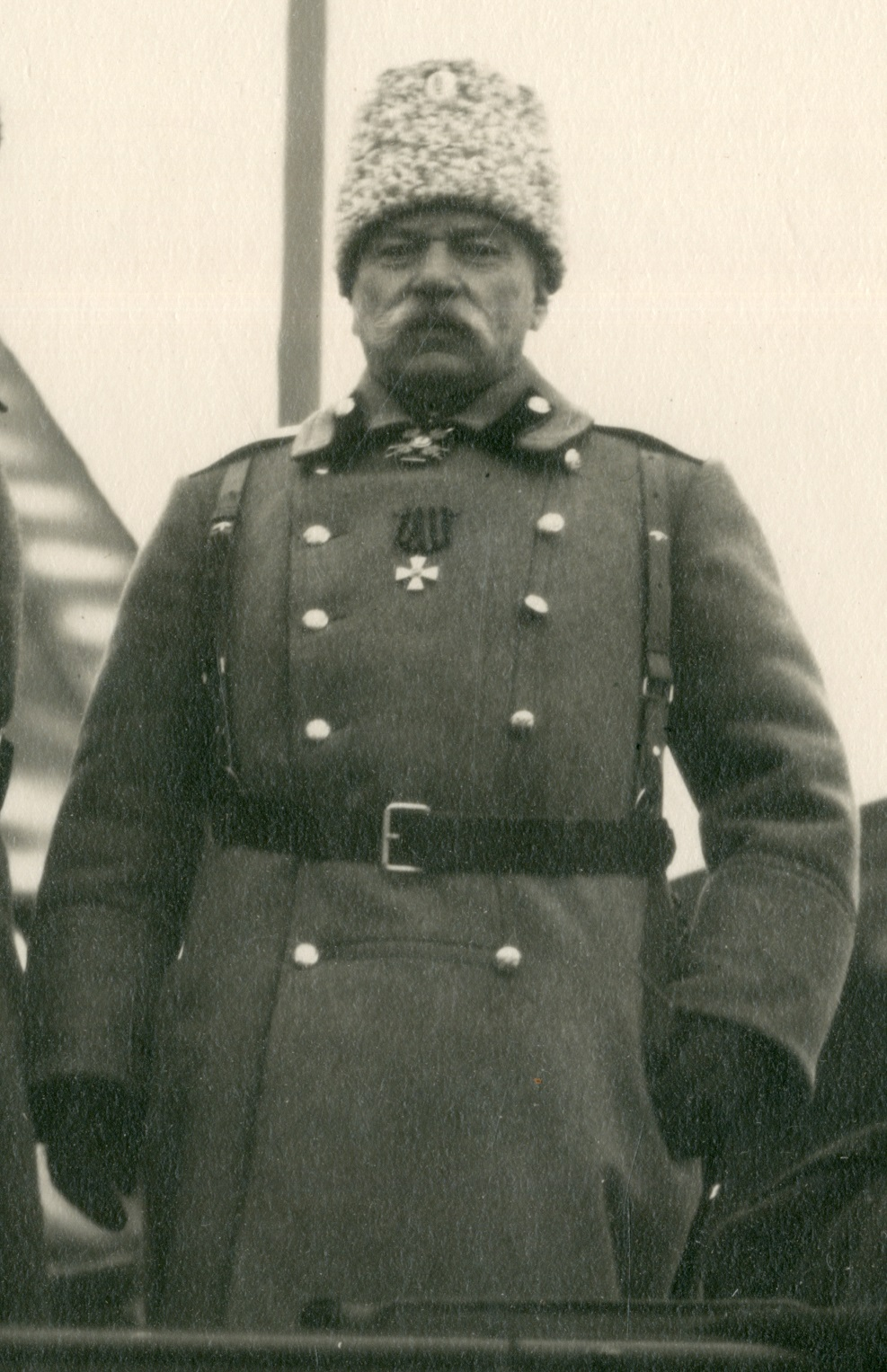
- Native name: Владимир Васильевич Смирнов
- Born: 4 June 1849; Russian Empire
- Died: 1 November 1918 (aged 69) Pyatigorsk, Russian SFSR
- Allegiance: Russian Empire; Russian Republic (from 1917)
- Branch: Imperial Russian Army; Russian Army (from 1917)
- Service years: 1865–1917
- Rank: General of the Infantry
- Commands: 131st Infantry Regiment; 18th Infantry Division; 2nd Siberian Army Corps; 20th Army Corps; 2nd Army; Western Front
- Conflicts: Russo-Turkish War; World War I; Second Battle of the Vistula River; Second Battle of Bolimów; Battle of Smorgon; Lake Naroch Offensive

Vladimir Vasilyevich Smirnov (Russian: Владимир Васильевич Смирнов; 4 June 1849 – 1 November 1918) was an Imperial Russian Army general of the infantry who was a division, corps and field army commander. He fought in the Russian-Turkish War of 1877–1878 and in World War I.

== Biography ==
Born on 4 June 1849, Smirnov began his education in the Polotsk Cadet Corps, then transferred to the Pavlovsk Military School on 23 August 1865. On 17 June 1867 he graduated as a second lieutenant and was assigned to the 28th Polotsk Infantry Regiment. On 17 July 1867, he received a promotion to ensign and transferred to the Life Guards of the Moscow Regiment, in which was promoted successively to second lieutenant on 17 April 1870, lieutenant on 30 August 1872, and staff captain on 30 August 1872.

In 1874, Smirnov graduated second in his class from the course of sciences at the Nikolayev Academy of the General Staff and was assigned to the headquarters of the Kharkov Military District. On 5 March 1875 he was appointed senior adjutant to the headquarters of the 36th Infantry Division and while there received a promotion to captain on 13 April 1875. On 1 December 1875 he became an assistant to the senior adjutant of the headquarters of the Kharkov Military District.

On 4 November 1876, Smirnov took up the post of senior adjutant of the headquarters of the 7th Army Corps, in whose ranks he took part in the Russian-Turkish War of 1877–1878, serving from 11 November 1877 at the headquarters of the Odessa Military District. For distinctive service in that conflict he was awarded the Order of Saint Anna 3rd class.

Smironov was promoted to lieutenant colonel on 16 April 1878 and to colonel on 12 April 12, 1881. From 1 August to 15 September 1881 he commanded a battalion of the 57th Modlinsky Infantry Regiment. Appointed chief of staff of the 5th Infantry Division on 20 July 1884, Smirnov spent almost seven years in that position. On 1 April 1891, he took command of the 131st Infantry Regiment at Tiraspol.

On 26 February 1894, Smirnov was promoted to major general for his distinguished service and was appointed chief of staff of the 9th Army Corps. On 4 July 1901 he was appointed commanding officer of the 18th Infantry Division, and on 6 December 1901 he was promoted to lieutenant general. On 9 July 1906, Smirnov became commanding officer of the 2nd Siberian Army Corps.

On 13 April 1908, Smirnov was promoted to general of the infantry, and on 28 July 1908 he took command of the 20th Army Corps.

=== World War I ===
When the Russian Empire entered World War I on 1 August 1914, Smirnov was still in command of the 20th Army Corps. For distinguished service at the front, he was awarded the Order of St. George Fourth Class on 25 October 1914. On 20 November 1914, Smirnov took command of the 2nd Army, the official order confirming him in this post following on 5 December 1914.

In March 1916, Smirnov was forced to leave the front due to a serious illness, and the 2nd Army, which dealt the main blow against Imperial German Army forces during the Lake Naroch Offensive, was transferred to the command of General Alexander Ragoza.

In March 1917, Smirnov relieved General Aleksei Evert as commander of the Western Front. A subordinate, V. Dzhunkovsky, lamented the end of Smirnov's long tour as commander of the 2nd Army, recalling: “The departure of the commander of the 2nd Army, General Smirnov: On the same day I published a farewell order of the commander of the army, the worthy General Smirnov, who received a different appointment. I was very sorry to leave the command of this honest, noble general.”

Smirnov's command of the Western Front was short-lived. On 8 April 1917, he was reassigned to the Ministry of War, and on 22 April 1917 he became a member of the Ministry of War's Military Council.

=== Russian Civil War ===
After the October Revolution, Smirnov moved from Petrograd to the Mineralnye Vody area. In September 1918, during the Russian Civil War, he was taken hostage by the Red Army and on 1 November 1918, together with generals Nikolai Ruzsky, Radko Dimitriev, and others, was shot at Pyatigorsk. According to other sources, he was shot by the Bolsheviks in Kiev in sometime between February and April 1919.

== Awards ==
- Order of Saint Anna, 3rd Class (1878)
- Order of Saint Stanislaus, 2nd Class (1883)
- Order of Saint Anna, 2nd Class (1887)
- Order of Saint Vladimir, 4th Class (1891)
- Order of Saint Vladimir, 3rd Class (1897)
- Order of Saint Stanislaus, 1st Class (1900)
- Order of Saint Anna, 1st Class (1904)
- Order of Saint Vladimir, 2nd Class (6 December 1911)
- Order of St. George, 4th Class (25 October 1914)
- Order of the White Eagle (1914)

Military offices
Preceded by	Chief of Staff of the 5th Infantry Division; 1884–1891	Succeeded by Alexander Ievreinov
Preceded by	Commander of the 131st Infantry Regiment; 1891–1894	Succeeded by
Preceded by	Commander of the 18th Infantry Division; 1901–1906	Succeeded by Yakov Schkinsky
Preceded by Mikhail Zasulich	Commander of the 2nd Siberian Army Corps; 1906–1908	Succeeded by
Preceded by Vladimir Alexandrovich Bekman	Commander of the 20th Army Corps; 1908–1914	Succeeded by Pavel Bulgakov
Preceded by Sergei Scheidemann	Commander of the 2nd Army; 5 December 1914 – 8 April 1917	Succeeded by Anthony Veselovsky
Preceded by Alexei Evert	Commander of the Western Front; 11–31 March 1917	Succeeded by Vasily Gurko

== Sources ==
- Военный дневник великого князя Андрея Владимировича Романова. (1914–1917). — Москва. Издательство им. Сабашниковых, 2008.- ISBN 5-8242-0097-1.
- Джунковский В. Ф. Воспоминания (1915–1917). Том 3. — М.: Издательство им. Сабашниковых, 2015.- ISBN 978-5-8242-0143-7.
- Залесский К. А. Кто был кто в Первой мировой войне. М., 2003.
- Рутыч Н. Н. Биографический справочник высших чинов Добровольческой армии и Вооруженных Сил Юга России. М., 2002.
- Список генералам по старшинству. Составлен по 1 сентября 1896 года. СПб., 1896
- Список генералам по старшинству. Составлен по 15 апреля 1914 года. Пг., 1914
- "Vladimir Smirnov (general)" (in Russian). «Russian army in a Great war» project.
- Фотография генерала Смирнова
