= Lake Naroch offensive =

Battle during the First World War

Coordinates: 54.8535°N 26.7761°E

- Part of Eastern Front during World War I
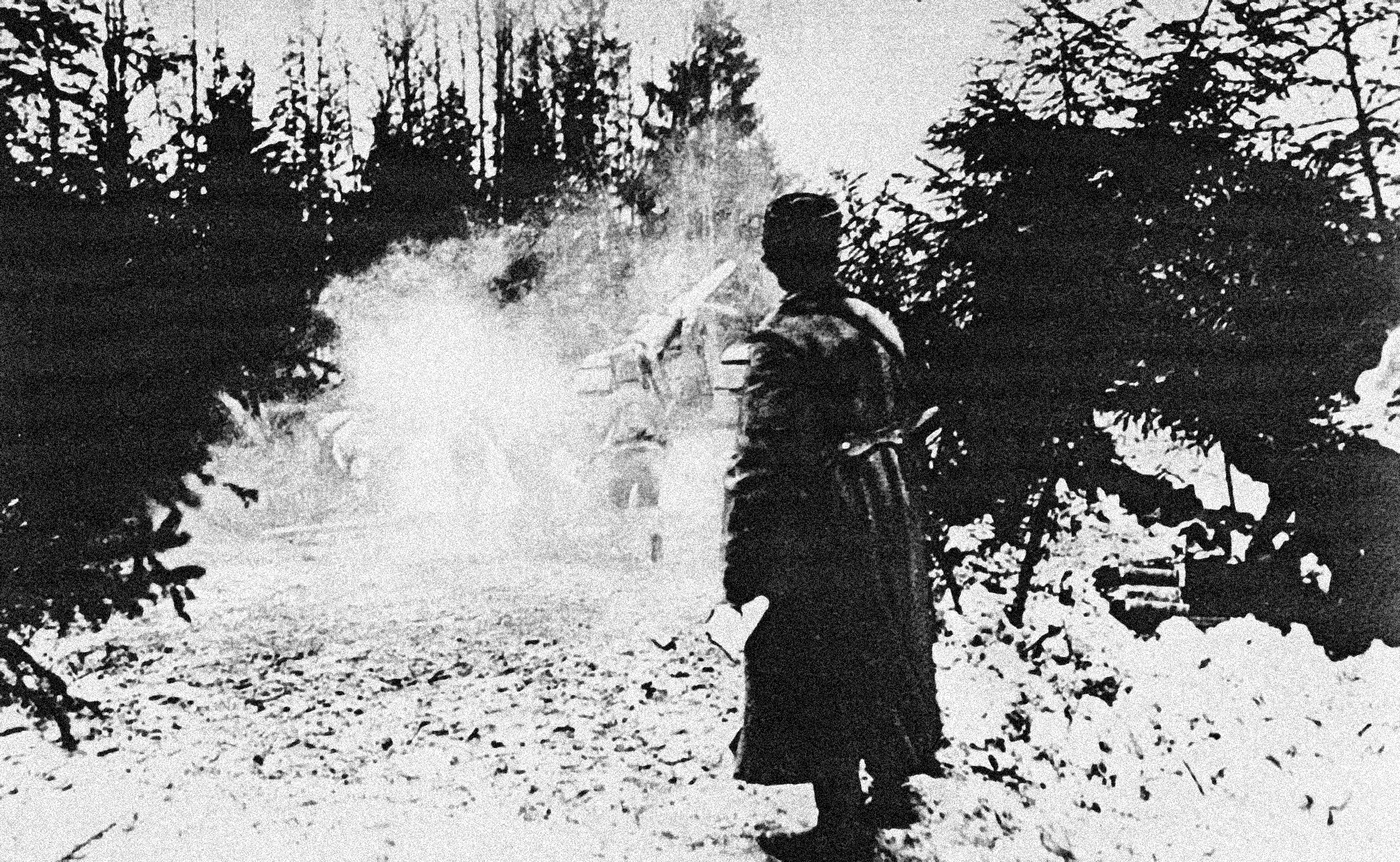
- Russian artillery firing during the offensive
Date	18–30 March 1916
Location	Lake Narach, Russian Empire (now Belarus)
Result	German victory

Belligerents
German Empire	Russian Empire

Commanders and leaders
(German Empire) Hermann von Eichhorn	Alexei Kuropatkin; Alexei Evert

Units involved
(German Empire) 10th Army	2nd Army

Strength
81,975–592,200; 720 guns	372,932–766,900; 887 guns

Casualties and losses
20,000 casualties (German estimate); 40,000 casualties (Russian estimate)	110,000 casualties (German estimate); 76,409 casualties (12,000 due to hypothermia) (Russian estimate)

The Lake Naroch offensive in 1916 was an unsuccessful Russian offensive on the Eastern Front in World War I. It was launched at the request of Marshal Joseph Joffre and intended to relieve the German pressure on French forces. Due to lack of reconnaissance, Russian artillery support failed to overcome and neutralise the well-fortified German defenses and artillery positions, leading to costly and unproductive direct attacks, hindered by the weather. On 30 March General Evert ordered a halt to the offensive.

== Background ==
Under the terms of the Chantilly Agreement of December 1915 Russia, France, Great Britain and Italy were committed to simultaneous attacks against the Central Powers in the summer of 1916. Russia felt the need to lend troops to fight in France and Salonika (against her own wishes), and to attack on the Eastern Front, in the hope of obtaining munitions from Britain and France.

The Lake Naroch offensive was launched at the request of France, in the hope that the Germans would transfer more units to the East after their attack on Verdun. Joseph Joffre had made the request directly to Mikhail Alexeyev. According to Prit Buttar, "Alexeyev now convened a meeting on 24 February that included all three front commanders, where it was decided that, given the losses suffered by Ivanov's troops in January, any new attack would have to be made by one or both of the other fronts. After some discussion, the point chosen was the junction between the two fronts." The Northern Front, commanded by Alexei Kuropatkin, and West Front, commanded by Alexei Evert, had 266,000 and 643,000 infantry respectively, while the opposing Germans amounted to 495,000.

== Comparison of strength ==
The Russian Northern Front was composed of the 12th Army, commanded by Vladimir Gorbatovsky, and the 5th Army, commanded by Vasily Gurko. The force devoted to the battle in the Russian West Front was composed of the 1st Army, commanded by Alexander Litvinov, and the 2nd Army, commanded by Vladimir Vasilyevich Smirnov. However, before the battle commenced, Smirnov was replaced by Alexander Ragoza.

The Russian 2nd Army was made up of 16 infantry and 4 cavalry divisions, 253 battalions, 133 squadrons and had 887 artillery pieces, whereas the German forces numbered 9 infantry and 3 cavalry divisions, 89 battalions, 72 squadrons and 720 guns of various calibres.

On either side of Lake Naroch was the German 10th Army, commanded by Hermann von Eichhorn. To the north was the 8th Army, commanded by Otto von Below, and to the south was the 12th Army, commanded by Max von Fabeck.

Ragoza organized his army into three groups, with the northern group led by Mikhail Pleshkov, consisted of the 1st and 26th Army Corps, with the 1st Siberian Corps. The central group, led by Leonid Sirelius, consisted of the 34th Army and 4th Siberian Corps. The southern group, led by Pyotr Baluyev.

== Battle ==
On the morning of 18 March, the Russian heavy artillery bombardment commenced in the northern and southern sectors. However, the bombardment proved ineffective. Russian assault columns found the German defences mostly intact, and suffered terrible flanking fire. The Russian 2nd Army suffered 15,000 casualties in that first day, with no gain. On the 19th, the Russian bombardment continued, but the Russian assault again faltered, resulting in an additional 5600 casualties. On 21 March, the Russian assault continued with the 1st, 27th Army and 1st Siberian Corps, and were able to capture the German front line. On 22 March the Russians were able to add somewhat to their modest gains. On 24 March, the Russian 5th Army Corps and 3rd Siberian Corps attacked on the southern sector, but with little gain. On 26 March, further attack by the Russian northern sector were also ineffective. On 29 March, Alexeyev ordered an end to the Russian assault.

== Results ==
The whole operation turned out to be an utter failure, as it abated the Russians' morale without providing any help to the French, and has become a shining example of the use of a widely known World War I method of war, the human wave attack. Huge masses of men were continuously sent into the battle over and over again in the same place of the enemy front. Eventually, the attack on the German positions was brought to a halt because, as General Evert noted in his order issued on 30 March, it had not led to "decisive results" and "the onset of warm weather and abundant rains" had turned much of the area into swamps.

== Literature ==
- Miltatuli, Pyotr (2017). Россия в эпоху царствование Николая II [Russia in the reign of Nicholas II] (in Russian). Vol. 2. Moscow: Русский издательский центр имени святого Василия Великого. ISBN 978-5-4249-0057-7. OCLC 1038064891.
- Holstein, Günther. Nacht am Narocz [Night at Lake Narach] text set to music by Siegfried Wagner for tenor and piano in 1919.
- Keegan, J. (2001). Der erste Weltkrieg. Eine europäische Tragödie [The First World War. A European Tragedy]. (in German) Rowohlt-Taschenbuch-Verlag, Reinbek bei Hamburg, ISBN 3-499-61194-5

• Lloyd, Nick (2024). The Eastern Front. A History of the Great War, 1914-1918. New York: Norton, 2024. ISBN 978-1-324-09271-1

- Podorozhniy N. E. (1938). Narochskaya operatsiya v marte 1916 g. na russkom fronte mirovoy voyni [The Naroch Offensive in March 1916 on the Russian Front of the World War] (in Russian) Moscow: Voenizdat. 1938
- Stone, N. (1998). The Eastern Front 1914–1917. Penguin Books Ltd., London, ISBN 0-14-026725-5
- Zabecki, D. T., editor (2014). Germany at War: 400 Years of Military History. ABC-CLIO, ISBN 978-1-59884-980-6
- Zentner, C. (2000). Der erste Weltkrieg. Daten, Fakten, Kommentare. Moewig, Rastatt 2000, ISBN 3-8118-1652-7
