= Battle of Smorgon =

Battle in Belarus during World War I

- Part of the Eastern Front of World War I
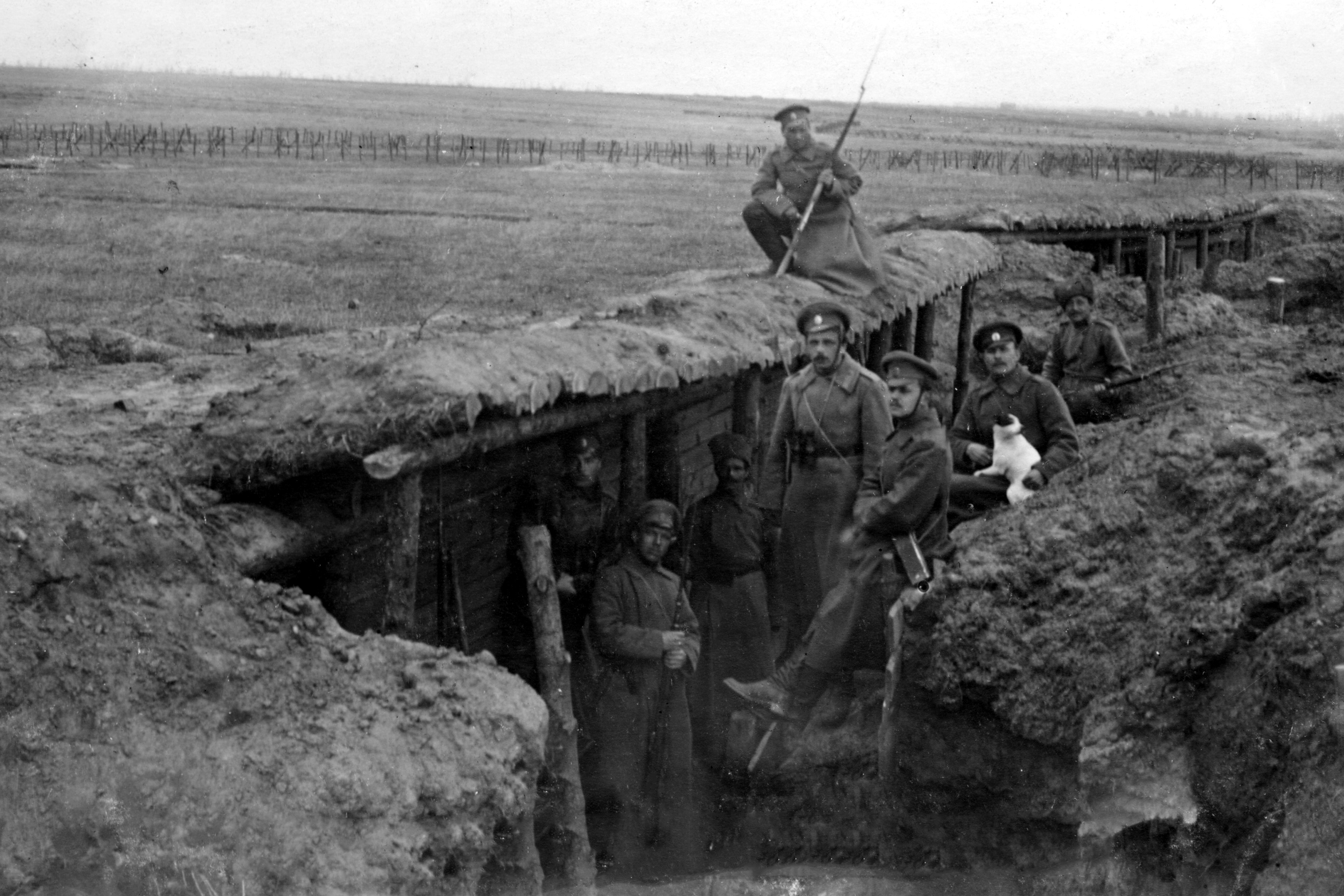
- Trenches near Smorgon, April 1917
Date	15 September 1915 – 4 December 1917 (2 years, 2 months, 2 weeks and 5 days)
Location	Smarhon, Grodno Governorate, (present day Smarhon District, Grodno Region)
Result	Russian victory
Territorial changes	Smorgon successfully defended; Russian offensive failed

Belligerents
Russian Empire	German Empire

Commanders and leaders
Anton Denikin	(German Empire) Otto von Garnier

Units involved
Western Front: 2nd Army; 10th Army	(German Empire) 6th German Cavalry Corps

Strength
Initial: 4 cavalry battalions 7 infantry battalions Final: 16 infantry divisions 2 cavalry divisions ~900 guns	6 infantry divisions 4 cavalry divisions

The Battle of Smorgon (Belarusian: Абарона Смаргоні; Russian: Оборона Сморгони) was an 810-day battle near the town of Smorgon along the Eastern Front of World War I. It was during this battle that Russian troops successfully halted the enemy's advance for the first time since the Great Retreat. In addition, Smorgonshchyna was one of the places of mass use of chemical weapons on the Eastern Front.

The settlement was completely destroyed and went down in history as a "dead city".

== Storming the city ==
On 9 September 1915, having broken through the front north of Vilnius and capturing Švenčionys on 12 September, the German VI Cavalry Corps began a raid on the rear of the Imperial Russian Army. On 13 September, the German cavalry approached the lakes Naroch and Svir. From here, the German 1st and 4th Cavalry Divisions advanced to Smorgon, the Vilnius–Molodechno railway and the crossings over the Viliya River.

On the morning of 15 September, a German cavalry regiment with artillery and machine guns attacked the settlement. Russian marching companies held the defense for eight hours. Then they hastily retreated to Kreva, to meet the reserve forces.

In the west, south and east of Smorgon, units of the 36th, 27th, 4th Siberian and 1st Cavalry Corps fought German forces. On 20 September, around three o'clock in the afternoon, the city was recaptured by a joint attack from the 9th and 10th Siberian Rifle, and 68th and 25th Infantry Divisions. The German units retreated to the north, beyond Viliya.

On the evening of 24 September, the Guards Corps forces approached the town from the west, retreating with battles from Vilnius. The next day, fierce battles began at the crossing over the Viliya, at the mill and the railway station. The entire 3rd Guards Infantry Division, the Kexholm Life Guards, Petrograd, Volhynian and Lithuanian Life Guards Regiments entered battle for the settlement.

In response, the Imperial German Army increased its onslaught, sending reinforcements into battle. The Preobrazhensky Life Guards Regiment and two battalions of the Grenadier Life Guards Regiment approached the Russian troops from the corps reserve. The Guard Regiments successfully repelled the attacks, holding their positions. At night, Smorgon was engulfed in fires.

In the morning, a white flag appeared over the German trenches. The Germans requested a truce on a four kilometer section of the front near the Viliya River to collect the wounded and dead. The Russians accepted the offer. During the truce, 3,800 dead Russian soldiers and officers and 5,500 Germans were buried. Among the victims were 150 local residents.

== Trench warfare ==
By the end of 1915, the enemy had exhausted its resources and was digging entrenchments. The Germans poured concrete into their firing points and dugouts (some of these fortifications have survived to this day).

The labyrinths of trenches and ditches grew larger every day, dozens of kilometers of railways: regular and narrow-gauge, locomotive and horse-drawn were built near Smorgon on both sides of the front, including a 19-kilometer branch from Prudy station to the "648th verst" post on the Molodechno-Lida road. Numerous bridges and ferry crossings were also built across the Viliya, dozens of kilometers of causeways were laid in the swamps north of Smorgon to Lake Vishnevskoye. "Track warfare" had begun. The terrain between the German and Russian trenches was relatively flat and open, sloping from west to east, creating favorable conditions for the use of chemical weapons.

On 12 October 1915, for the first time on the Russian front, the Germans used gas in the Smorgon sector against the 3rd Guards Infantry Division. Gas attacks became more frequent from April 1916. Significant damage was caused by a chemical attack on 2 July, when in an hour and a half the gas penetrated more than 20 kilometers toward Molodechno. 40 officers and 2,076 soldiers of the 64th and 84th Infantry Divisions were poisoned. There were even more casualties on 2 August. During the night, the Germans released gas on the positions of the Caucasian Grenadier Division eight times at half-hour intervals. 286 people died, 3,846 were injured.

From 18 March to 29 March 1916, 20 kilometers north of Smorgon, near the village of Vishnevo and Lake Naroch, the 2nd Army advanced. In the Smorgon sector, near the villages of Chernyaty, Gorydenyaty and Dubatovka, divisions of the 10th Army distracted the enemy with daily artillery shelling, machine gun and rifle fire, ensuring the main attack. However, the Germans prevented the Russian advance, holding their positions.

Throughout June, sappers of the 52nd Sapper Battalion of the 26th Army Corps dug a tunnel into the enemy rear to height 72.9 (Golden Hill) on the outskirts of Smorgon, where a German battery was located. On the day of the assault, dynamite planted underground was detonated, and the 225th Ackerman and 258th Kishinev Regiments took the height by storm. On 6 September, at the same height, for the first time during the war, Russian troops used gas. In 15 minutes of the attack, 13 tons of chlorine were released on the German trenches.

In autumn, in order to somehow ease the situation on the Galician front, the Germans carried out a number of attacks on the city, but all these attacks were repulsed.

After the February Revolution, the morale of the troops was undermined. The new authorities decided to carry out a psychological operation – to send the Women's Battalion to Smorgon. From 7 July to 10 1917, in the battle for Novospassky Forest (south of Smorgon, near Krevo), the unit entered into combat with the enemy. Initially, the battalion performed well: it successfully repelled 14 German counterattacks, showed courage, stopped retreating male soldiers and robbers, and took alcohol from servicemen. However, in the end, the women, having come under fire from the Germans, weakened and became confused.

From July 19 to 23, a new attack was organized, also near Krevo. Despite the significant numerical advantage of troops and artillery – 16 infantry and 2 cavalry divisions, about 800 guns and a 13-day ration of shells, the Russian army's offensive failed. After the battles, there were cases of fraternization with the Germans and refusals to continue military operations.

On 4 December, in the town of Soly, ten kilometers west of Smorgon, and ten days before the signing of the general armistice at Brest (15 December 1917), the Germans concluded an armistice along the Western Russian Front.

== Memory ==
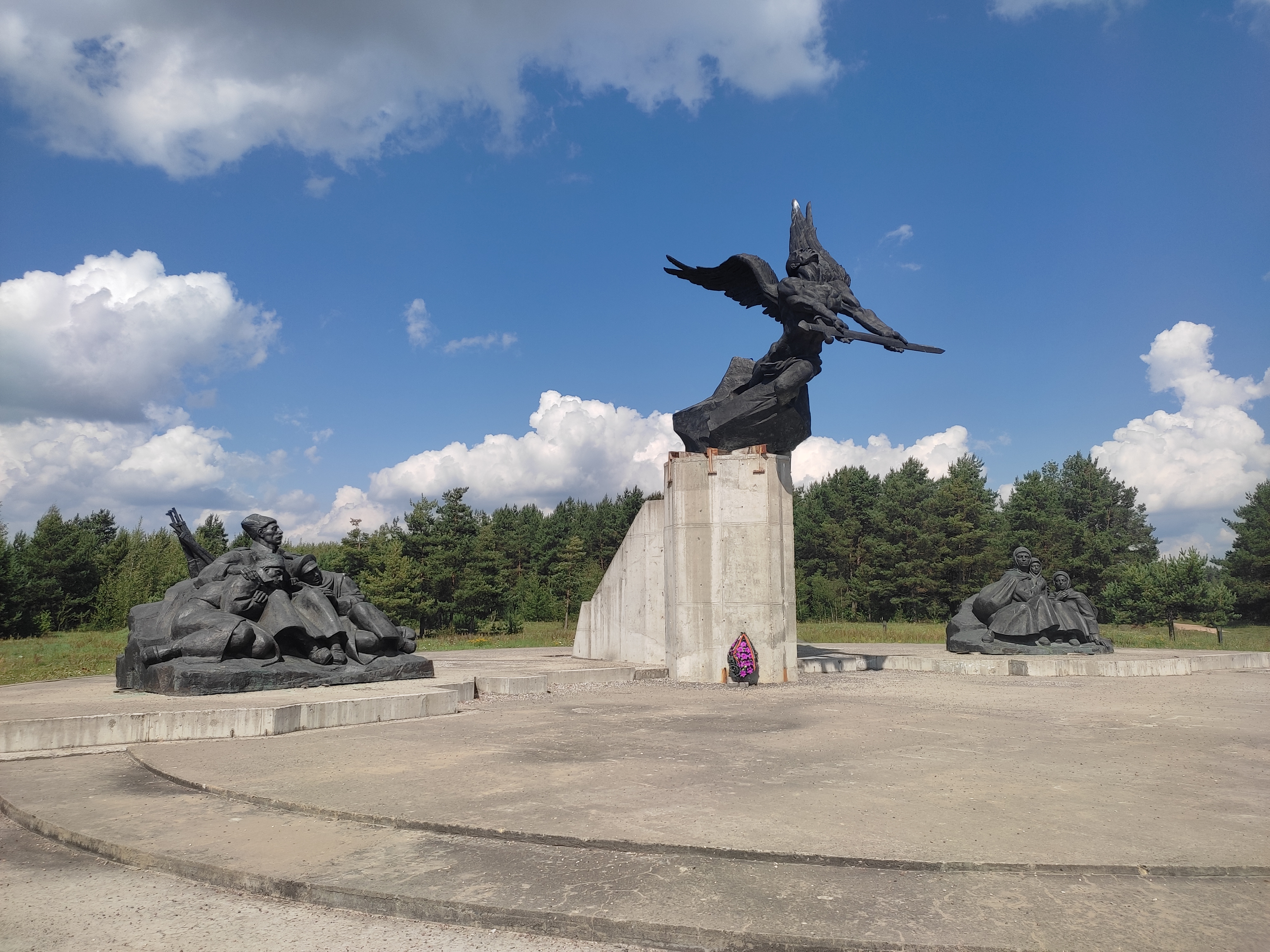
Memorial to the First World War, 2023. The central sculpture is "Winged Genius of Military Glory", the left one is "Soldiers of the First World War", the right one is "Refugees".

The settlement was completely destroyed by artillery, and dug in with trenches. The newspaper "Niva" No. 25 for 1916 called Smorgon "a dead city".

There was a phrase among Russian soldiers: "Whoever has not been to Smorgon, has not seen the war" («Кто под Сморгонью не бывал, тот войны не видал») (in the Belarusian version - "Whoever has not been to Smorgon, has not known / has not seen / has not observed that war", «Хто пад Смаргонню не бываў, той вайны не спазнаў / не відаў / не бачыў»).

The legacy left by World War I in the Smorgon region is considered the most significant in Belarus. During the years of confrontation, German and Russian troops built multi-kilometer defense lines here, developed communication systems that stretched from Lake Vishnevskoye in the north to the Western Berezina in the south. On both sides, the front line was marked by a huge number of cemeteries.

The city has the largest memorial in Belarus to the heroes and victims of World War I. The complex was opened on the 100th anniversary of the outbreak of war in 2014. It includes the sculptures "Winged Genius of Military Glory", "Soldiers of World War I" and "Refugees". A chapel has also been erected on the territory and a "Memory Stone" has been installed with an appeal to descendants. A little further from the entrance, marked by the St. George's Cross, there is a zone of memory and sorrow - a bronze map of the military events of 1915–1917, two memorial urns with soil from the burial sites of soldiers of the Russian and German armies, a chapel with a bell.

== See also ==
- Belarus in World War I

== Sources ==
- Билевич, О. И. Героические и трагические страницы обороны Сморгони // Вестник Брестского государственного технического университета. — 2014. — No. 6. — С. 3–5.
- Галдзянкоў, М. Забытая Першая сусветная вайна / Міхаіл Галдзянкоў. — Мінск : Галіяфы, 2017. — 208 с. : іл.
- Borisyuk, Andrey (2024). Забытая война. Россия в 1914-1918 [The forgotten war. Russia in 1914-1918] (in Russian). Moscow: Вече. ISBN 978-5-4484-5078-5.
