= Aleksei Evert =

Russian general (1857–1918 or 1926)

Aleksei Ermolaevich Evert
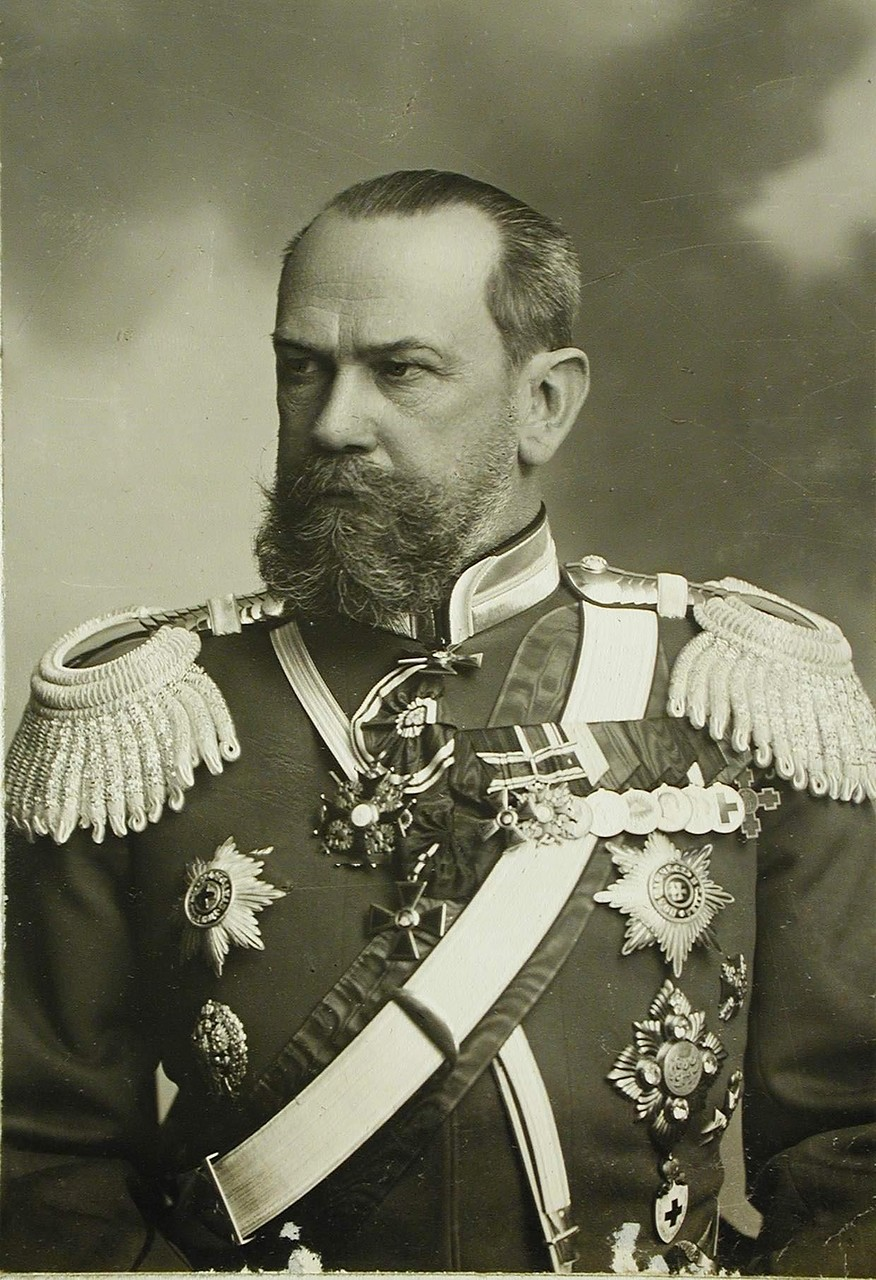
- Born: 4 March 1857; Moscow, Moscow Governorate, Russian Empire
- Died: 12 November 1918 (aged 61); Or 10 May 1926 (aged 69); Mozhaisk, Moscow Governorate, Russian SFSR; Or Vereya, Moscow Governorate, Russian SFSR, USSR
- Military career
- Allegiance: Russian Empire
- Branch: (Russian Empire) Russian Imperial Army
- Service years: 1876–1917
- Rank: General of the Infantry
- Conflicts: Russo-Turkish War; Russo-Japanese War; World War I
- Awards: See below

Aleksei Ermolaevich Evert (Russian: Алексе́й Ермола́евич Э́верт; German: Alexei Ewert; also written Everth or Ewarts; 4 March 1857 – 12 November 1918 or 10 May 1926) was an Imperial Russian general of German descent.

== Early life and career ==
Aleksei Ermolaevich Evert was born on March 4, 1857, in Moscow, to a family of nobility with Orthodox German ancestry. He was born to Ermolai I. Evert in the small village of Smolinskoye in the Moscow Governorate. Aleksei graduated from the 1st Moscow Catherine II Cadet Corps in 1874 and the Alexandrovskoye Military School in 1876. He then served in the Volinsky Life-Guards Regiment.

He first saw military action in the Russo-Turkish War of 1877. In 1882, Evert graduated from the Nikolayev Academy of General Staff, after which he served at the Moscow Military District under the commander-in-chief of the military district, General Pontus Brevern-de la Gardie. In late 1882, Evert was made senior adjutant of the 3rd Infantry Division. In late March 1886, he was appointed to the Warsaw Military District and made senior adjutant of the headquarters of the military district in November. He later became commander of several minor Regiments before he was appointed staff officer of the Warsaw Military District again, this time for special assignments under the commander-in-chief Count Gurko. In late January 1893, he was appointed the chief of staff of the 10th Infantry Division. Then in late 1900, 1901, and late October 1903, he was made the chief of staff of the 11th, 14th and 5th Army Corps, respectively.

=== Russo-Japanese War ===
In 1904, General Evert took part in the Russo-Japanese War. About seven months into the war, he was made quartermaster-general of the Field Staff of the Commander-in-chief Admiral Yevgeni Alekseyev. In late March 1905, he was appointed the head of the headquarters of 1st Manchurian Army. At the end of the war, he was awarded the Gold Sword for Bravery in 1906, for military distinction. In mid April 1906, he was appointed the chief of staff of the 13th Army Corps, and later commander in 1908. In 1911, Evert was promoted to General of the Infantry, and in mid 1912, he was appointed the commander-in-chief of the Irkutsk Military District and ataman of the Transbaikal Cossack host.

Upon being appointed commander of the Irkutsk Military District and the ataman of the Transbaikal Cossack host, Evert lived in the former house of a merchant (now the Actor's House). The military district headquarters and the director of the general on duty were housed in the Fainberg house (now a half-ruined building on Khalturin Street).

== World War I ==
The First World War broke out in 1914, and with that, General Evert was appointed to command the 10th Army. And he briefly participated in the East Prussian Campaign, but after several days, he was replaced by Lieutenant-General Vasily Flug, and he later replaced the aged General Zaltsa, after which he took part in the Invasion of Galicia and the battle at Vistula River. In mid August 1915, Evert later replaced army chief of staff General Mikhail Alekseyev as the commander-in-chief of the Western Front, he was also made adjutant-general later in December of that year. From May to June, Evert and his army fought the Austro-German forces at Opatov and Lublin. And in September, his forces successfully repelled the Austro-German breakthrough between the cities of Smorgon and Dvinsk, for this success, he was awarded the Order of St. George of the 3rd degree in early October.

In early March 1916, he commanded an offensive at Lake Naroch in what is now Belarus, together with General Aleksey Kuropatkin. But due to a lack of scouting and artillery support, Russian artilleries were unable to capture the well-fortified German defense, causing the offensive to fail.

The French Slavic professor Jules Legras, who arrived in the Russia in February 1916 on the instructions of the Military Propaganda Department at the second department of the General Staff of the French Ministry of Defense, in his memoirs, he negatively assessed the actions of Evert:

Constant orders and counter-orders on the eve of the attack; continuous fluctuations about the grouping of military units, intervention in the course of the operation, for example, two days before the change, the unit that knew the site changed to another that had never seen it. Finally, after failures, offensive reproaches addressed the commander and the generals who obeyed (Evert). Having studied these documents, I felt great sorrow: General Evert's lack of talent manifested itself here in these pompous and empty phrases; his indecision, underlined by countless counter-orders; his misunderstanding of reality, dispersed in instructions, when every person who knew the trenches and material means that the Germans had at their disposal was aware of the impossibility of this operation

=== Brusilov Offensive ===
According to the directive of the Russian Supreme Command Headquarters in late April 1916, an offensive on the middle of the Western Front was entrusted to Evert. However, with the connivance of the Supreme commander-in-chief Tsar Nicholas II, the general repeatedly delayed the terms of the offensive when the Brusilov Offensive occurred in the neighbouring front. The offensive originally planned to target Vilnius, but it was changed to target Baranovichi (now Baranavichy in Belarus). Despite months of planning, the offensive failed to break through the German defense.

General Aleksei Brusilov, commander-in-chief of the Southwestern Front and the planner of the Brusilov Offensive (which was named after him), gave the following assessment to General Evert:

The attack on Baranovichi took place, but, as it was not difficult to foresee, the troops suffered huge losses with total failure, and this ended the fighting activities of the Western Front to facilitate my offensive.

The Western Front did not inflict the main blow.

All Russia rejoiced, the names of Evert and, in particular, Kuropatkin, were condemned, and Evert was also ranked as a traitor.

Similar estimates are available in some encyclopaedic sources.

Evert's lack of talent as a commander and his extreme indecision were particularly evident during the offensive in the summer of 1916 in the Vilnius direction and in the region of Baranovichi.

Since Aug. 1915 until March 1917 commanded the troops of the West. front, but in this post did not show a generalship talent and determination. This was especially evident in the summer of 1916, when Evert tore off the application of Ch. strike on the Vilensky direction during the summer offensive of 1916, and then failed the offensive in the region of Baranovichi.

In early 1917, General Evert proposed an attack towards Vilnius, but these plans were strongly opposed among other generals, especially General Vasily Gurko and Alexander Lukomsky. Under the new plan by Alekseyev, he assigned the task of inflicting a counterattack to the 10th Army.

=== February Revolution ===
On March 2, 1917, after the revolutionaries took over the government, Alekseyev sent Nicholas II a telegram, urging abdication, General Evert replied Alekseyev that he would give his conclusion after General Ruzsky and Brusilov answered. Learning their answers, he sent the tsar a telegram, in which referred to the fact that the army "in its present composition ... can not be counted," wrote that "finding no other outcome, unlimitedly devoted to your Majesty, the loyal subject begs Your Majesty, in the name of the salvation of the Motherland and the Dynasty, to make a decision ... as the only one apparently capable of ending the revolution and saving Russia from the horrors of anarchy. "

According to the memoirs of General Ali-Agha Shikhlinsky, after the February Revolution, one of the members of the Duma, Nikolai Shchepkin, who was ordered by the new minister of war of the newly formed Russian Republic, Alexander Guchkov, to go to Minsk. After Shchepkin's arrival at Minsk, he suggested to high commands to get General Evert removed, so he did. After his removal, he was briefly replaced by General Vladimir Smirnov, and then Gurko. In March, he was dismissed from service with pensions and a uniform.

=== Last years and death ===
There is considerable uncertainty about how and when Evert actually died with no clear consensus established from the historical record. One theory is that he was arrested by the Cheka, and was murdered after being imprisoned in Mozhaisk (according to the memoirs of Prince Vladimir Drutskoy-Sokolinsky). Another version is that he was released after being imprisoned by the Bolsheviks and after that he engaged in beekeeping and died peacefully at the age of 69. The most likely version is that he was killed by the guards on his way to Mozhaisk, and he was buried in a local cemetery there.

== Personal life ==
General Evert married Nadezhda Poznanskaya and with whom had seven children: Ignatius, Boris, Vladimir, Sophia, Valentina, Vera, Vsevolod. Vsevolod died young in 1910, Ignatius was killed in 1938, Sophia and Valentina died in Moscow, the fates of the others are currently unknown. Poznanskaya preserved the circumstance of her husband's death in a private collection.

General Evert had a brother named Apollo Evert who was a lieutenant-general in the Imperial Russian Army.

== Honours and awards ==
=== Domestic ===
- Order of St. Anna, 4th class (1878)
- Order of St. Stanislaus, 3rd class (1879)
- Order of St. Anna, 3rd class (1885)
- Order of St. Stanislaus, 2nd class (1888)
- Order of St. Anna, 2nd class (1895)
- Order of St. Vladimir, 4th class (1899)
- Order of St. Vladimir, 3rd class (1903)
- Order of St. Stanislaus], 1st class with swords (VP 28.2.1906)
- Gold Sword for Bravery (VP 18.6.1906)
- Order of St. Anna, 1st class (1905)
- Order of St. Vladimir, 3rd class (6.12.1912)
- Order of St. George, 4th class (VP 18.9.1914)
- Order of St. Alexander Nevsky (VP 10.01.1915)
- Order of the White Eagle (VP 10.01.1915)
- Order of St. George, 3rd class (VP 08.10.1915)

=== Foreign ===
- Kingdom of Romania:
  - Cross "For crossing the Danube"
- Emirate of Bukhara
  - Order of the Crown of Bukhara
