= 4th Army (Russian Empire) =

Russian field army in World War I

The Russian Fourth Army was a World War I Russian field army that fought on the Eastern Front.

== Composition ==
At the beginning of the war, the army consisted of:

- Field Office (HQ 4th Army) (formed on August 2, 1914 at the headquarters of the Kazan Military District)
- Grenadier Corps
- 14th Army Corps
- 16th Army Corps
- 3rd Caucasian Corps (transferred from Third Army)

At the end of 1917:

- 8th Army Corps

== Deployment ==
- Southwestern Front (August 1914 – June 1915)
- Northwestern Front (June–August 1915)
- Western Front (August 1915 – October 1916)
- Romanian Front (December 1916 – early 1918)

== Commanders ==
- 19.07.1914 – 22.08.1914 - General of Infantry Baron Anton von Saltza
- 22.08.1914 – 20.08.1915 - General of Infantry Alexei Evert
- 30.08.1915 – 21.11.1917 - General of Infantry Alexander Ragoza

== See also ==
- List of Imperial Russian Army formations and units
