= East Siberian Military District =

Military district of the Russian Empire and Soviet Union

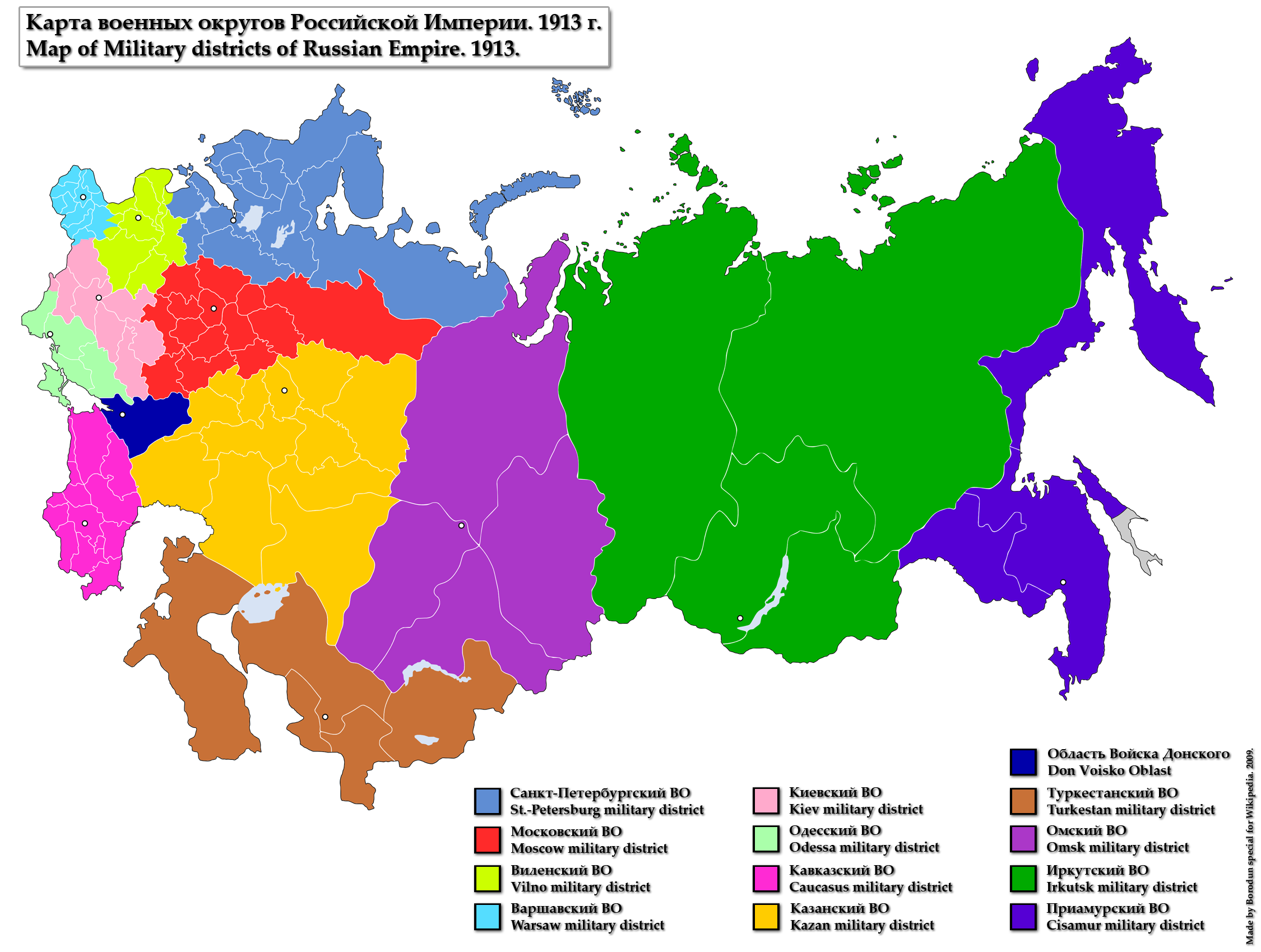
Irkutsk Military District (1913) in dark green

The East Siberian Military District was a military district of the Russian Empire and the Soviet Union, which existed between 1865—1884, 1920—1923 and 1945—1953. Between 1884-1919, it was known as the Irkutsk Military District.

== History ==
The East Siberian Military District was originally formed as a military district of the Russian Empire in 1864. It included the territories of the Irkutsk and Yenisei provinces, and Amur, Transbaikal, Primorsk and Yakutsk regions. On July 14, 1884, it was divided into two separate military districts : the Irkutsk Military District and the Amur Military District, which existed until 1919, when the Red Army conquered Siberia.

After the arrival of the Red Army, a new East Siberian Military District of the Red Army was formed on March 15, 1920 on the territory that included the Tomsk, Yenisei, Irkutsk provinces and the Yakutsk region. In January 1923, the district was abolished. The territory and troops were transferred to the Siberian Military District.

On July 9, 1945, the East Siberian Military District was created for the third time, as part of the Irkutsk Region, Krasnoyarsk Territory, the Yakutsk Autonomous Soviet Socialist Republic and the Tuva Autonomous District. On June 30, 1953, the district was disbanded with the transfer of territory and troops to the West Siberian and Zabaikalsky military districts.

== Commanders ==
=== East Siberian Military District ===
- Lieutenant General Mikhail Semyonovich Korsakov (1865–71),
- Lieutenant General Nikolay Petrovich Sinelnikov (1871–75),
- Lieutenant General Platon Alexandrovich Fredericks (1875–79),
- Lieutenant General Dmitry Gavrilovich Anuchin (1879–84).

=== Irkutsk Military District ===
- Lieutenant General Dmitry Gavrilovich Anuchin; (July 1884 - January 1885)
- Lieutenant General Count Alexey Pavlovich Ignatiev; (April 1885- May 1889)
- General of Infantry Alexander Dmitrievich Goremykin (May 1889 - June 1899)
- General of Infantry Andrey Selivanov (April 1906 - July 1910)
- General of Infantry Alexander Vasilyevich Brilevich; (August 1910 - March 1911)
- General of artillery Vladimir Nikolayevich Nikitin (March 1911 - June 1912)
- General of Infantry Aleksei Evert (June 1912 - August 1914)
- General of artillery Arkady Nikanorovich Nishenkov (interim) (08.1914-11.1914)
- General of Infantry V.E.Bukholts (November 1914 - September 1915)
- General of Infantry Yakov Schkinsky (October 1915 - March 1917)
- Major General P.G. Felitsyn (03.1917 - 07.1917)
- Major General N.P. Naperstkov (in the absence of P.G. Felitsyn)
- A.A. Krakovetsky (? -09.1917)
- Major General S. N. Samarin
- Colonel Alexander Vasilievich Elerts-Usov (July 1918 - December 1918)
- Major General Vyacheslav Ivanovich Volkov (December 1918 - February 1919)
- Lieutenant General Vasily Vasilyevich Artemiev (February - December 1919)

=== East Siberian MD ===
- Okulov, Alexey Ivanovich (1920)
- Mikhail Matiyasevich (1920-1921)
- Ieronim Uborevich (1921-1922)
- Kasyan Chaykovsky (1922)

=== East Siberian MD ===
- Colonel General Prokofy Romanenko (July 1945 - February 1947)
- General of the Army Georgy Zakharov (February 1947 - April 1950)
- Colonel-General Dmitry Gusev (April 1950 - March 1951)
- Colonel General Ivan Boldin (March 1951 - June 1953)
