= 18th Infantry Division (Russian Empire) =

- 18-я пехотная дивизия
- Active: 1806–1918
- Country: Russian Empire
- Branch: Russian Imperial Army
- Role: Infantry
- Engagements: World War I

The 18th Infantry Division (Russian: 18-я пехо́тная диви́зия, 18-ya Pekhotnaya Diviziya) was an infantry formation of the Russian Imperial Army during World War I and the Russian Civil War.

Formed in 1806 as the 10th Infantry Division, it underwent several reorganizations, being redesignated as the 15th in 1820, the 12th in 1833, and the 18th in 1835.

By 1914 it was part of the 14th Army Corps at Lublin.

== Organization ==
- 1st Brigade (Lublin)
  - 69th Ryazan Infantry Regiment (Lublin)
  - 70th Ryazhsk Infantry Regiment (Siedlce)
- 2nd Brigade (Ivangorod)
  - 71st Belyov Infantry Regiment (Novaya Aleksandria)
  - 72nd Tula Infantry Regiment (Ivangorod)
- 18th Artillery Brigade

== Commanders ==
- 1901-1906: Vladimir Vasilyevich Smirnov
- 1907-1908: Yakov Schkinsky
