= 27th Army Corps (Russian Empire) =

- Country: Russian Empire
- Allegiance: Imperial Russian Army

The 27th Army Corps was an Army corps in the Imperial Russian Army.

== Part of ==
- 2nd Army: 1914
- 1st Army: 1915
- 2nd Army: 1915 - 1916
- 1st Army: 1916
- 12th Army: 1917
- 5th Army: 1917
