= 5th Infantry Division (Russian Empire) =

- 5-я пехотная дивизия
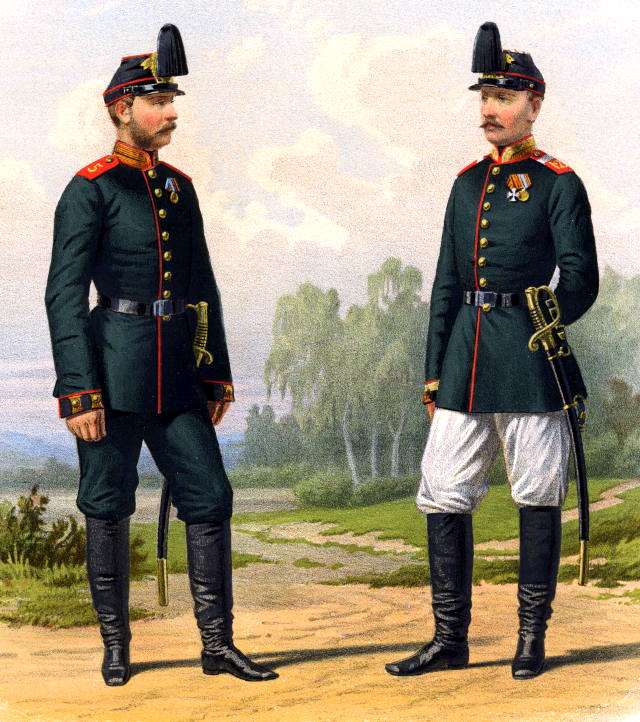
- Artillery officers of the 5th Infantry Division, 1878
- Active: 1806 – c. 1918
- Country: Russian Empire
- Branch: (Russian Empire) Russian Imperial Army
- Role: Infantry
- Size: approx. 20,000
- Garrison/HQ: Zhytomyr
- Engagements: Russo-Turkish War of 1877–78; World War I

The 5th Infantry Division (Russian: 5-я пехотная дивизия, 5-ya pekhotnaya diviziya) was an infantry formation of the Russian Imperial Army that existed in various formations from 1806 until the end of World War I and the Russian Revolution. When the war broke out in 1914 it was based in Zhytomyr and was part of the 9th Army Corps.

== History ==
It was formed in 1806 as the 6th Infantry Division and was later reorganized into the 5th Infantry Division. The division took part in the Russo-Turkish War of 1877-78 and fought near Plovdiv. It later served during World War I was demobilized around the time of the Russian Revolution and the subsequent unrest.

== Organization ==
Russian infantry divisions consisted of a staff, two infantry brigades, and one artillery brigade. The 5th Infantry Division was part of the 9th Army Corps as of 1914.

- 1st Brigade
  - 17th His Imperial Highness Grand Duke Vladimir Alexandrovich's Archangel Infantry Regiment
  - 18th His Majesty the King of Romania's Vologda Infantry Regiment
- 2nd Brigade
  - 19th Kostroma Infantry Regiment
  - 20th Galich Infantry Regiment
- 5th Artillery Brigade

== Known commanders ==
	Name	From	To
1	Lieutenant General Apostol Kostanda	30 August 1864	6 November 1869
2	Lieutenant General Duke Georgy Tumanov	19 December 1897	2 June 1901
3	Lieutenant General Evgeny Kakurin	4 July 1901	1 June 1903
4	Lieutenant General Dmitry Shuvayev	10 January 1905	24 May 1908
5	Lieutenant General Andrei Perekrestov	10 June 1908	after 1 January 1913
6	Lieutenant General Pavel Parchevsky	31 December 1913	1 March 1916

== Known chiefs of staff ==
	Name	From	To
1	Colonel Mikhail Mirkovich	11 April 1867	20 October 1869
2	Colonel Vladimir Smirnov	20 July 1884	1 April 1891
3	Colonel Alexander Iyevreinov	9 April 1891	28 December 1894
4	Colonel Alexander Ragoza	10 March 1898	27 April 1900
5	Colonel Mikhail Yakovlev	21 May 1900	8 May 1902
6	Colonel Vasilyev	around 1903	
7	Colonel Nikolai Ostryansky	23 June 1904	14 August 1906
8	Colonel Konstantin Yegoryev	14 August 1906	3 June 1910
9	Colonel Firsov	to 1913	after April 1914
10	Colonel Vasily Uperov	23 February 1915	1 January 1916
