= Yakov Schkinsky =

Imperial Russian division and corps commander

Yakov Federovich Shkinsky
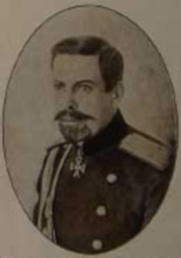
- Born: 4 June 1853
- Died: 22 April 1938 (aged 79); Belgrade, Kingdom of Yugoslavia
- Allegiance: Russian Empire (Russia) White movement
- Service / branch: Imperial Russian Army
- Commands: 18th Infantry Division; 3rd Guards Infantry Division; 1st Siberian Army Corps; 21st Army Corps; Irkutsk Military District
- Battles / wars: Russo-Turkish War; Russo-Japanese War; World War I Russian Civil War

Yakov Federovich Shkinsky (4 June 1858 – 22 April 1938) was an Imperial Russian division and corps commander. He fought in the wars against the Ottoman Empire and the Empire of Japan. After the October Revolution, he fought against the Bolsheviks and after the end of the subsequent civil war, he emigrated to Yugoslavia.

== Awards ==
- Order of Saint Anna, 4th class, 1878
- Order of Saint Stanislaus (House of Romanov), 3rd class, 1878
- Order of Saint Anna, 3rd class, 1884
- Order of Saint Stanislaus (House of Romanov), 2nd class, 1888
- Order of Saint Anna, 2nd class, 1891
- Order of Saint Vladimir, 4th class, 1895
- Order of Saint Vladimir, 3rd class, 1898
- Order of Saint Stanislaus (House of Romanov), 1st class, 1903
- Order of Saint Anna, 1st class, 1909
- Order of Saint Vladimir, 2nd class (6 December 1914)
- Order of the White Eagle (Russian Empire), 1915
- Order of Saint Alexander Nevsky (10 April 1916)

Preceded by	Commander of the 18th Infantry Division; 1907–1908	Succeeded by
Preceded by	Commander of the 3rd Guards Infantry Division; 1908–1910	Succeeded by
Preceded by Aleksandr Gerngross	Commander of the 1st Siberian Army Corps; 1910–1911	Succeeded by Arkady Nikanorovich Nishenkov
Preceded by	Commander of the 21st Army Corps; 1914–1915	Succeeded by

== Sources ==
- Волков С.В. Офицеры российской гвардии, М., 2002
- Высочайшие приказы о чинах военных, 04.1914
- Незабытые могилы, т. 6, кн. 3
