= 14th Army Corps (Russian Empire) =

Army corps in the Imperial Russian Army

- Country: Russian Empire
- Allegiance: Imperial Russian Army
- Engagements: World War I; Battle of the Vistula River; Battle of Galicia

The 14th Army Corps was an Army corps in the Imperial Russian Army.

== Composition ==
- 18th Infantry Division
- 13th Cavalry Division
- 14th Cavalry Division

== Part of ==
- 4th Army: 1914
- 9th Army: 1914
- 4th Army: 1914 - 1915
- 3rd Army: 1915
- 1st Army: 1916
- 5th Army: 1916
- 1st Army: 1916 - 1917
- 5th Army: 1917
