= 2nd Army (Russian Empire) =

- Active: July 1914 – beginning of 1918
- Country: Russian Empire
- Branch: Imperial Russian Army
- Type: Army
- Field HQ: Warsaw; Slutsk
- Engagements: World War I Eastern Front Tannenberg Warsaw and Ivangorod Lodz Four Rivers Second Battle of Bolimów Battle of Smorgon Lake Naroch offensive

Commanders
- Notable commanders: General Alexander Samsonov

The Russian 2nd Army (2-я армия, 2А) was an army-level command of the Imperial Russian Army in World War I. It was formed just prior to the outbreak of hostilities from the units of Warsaw Military District and was mobilized in August 1914. The army was effectively destroyed at Battle of Tannenberg in August 1914. However, it was rebuilt soon thereafter and fought until almost the end of the war.

== Organization ==
- Field headquarters (2A staff)
  - Headquarters of the 2A artillery inspector
  - 2nd Army Aviation Detachment of the Imperial Russian Air Service

The field headquarters of the 2nd Army was formed from the staff of the Warsaw Military District in July 1914. Towards the end of 1917, the staff was based in Slutsk, Belarus. It was dissolved in early 1918.

In the beginning of World War I, the army included the 1st, VI, XIII, XV and XXIII army corps.

Near the end of 1917, the army included:

- Grenadier Corps
- IX Army Corps
  - 5th Infantry Division
  - 42nd Infantry Division
  - 9th Cavalry Division
- L Army Corps
- III Siberian Army Corps

== History ==
Prior to the outbreak of war, in which Russia would likely have to face both Germany and Austria-Hungary, the 2nd Army had been intended to be a reserve formation, held back until either of the formations engaged against Germany and Austria-Hungary required reinforcements.

Following the outbreak of war it was mobilised in early August and placed under the command of General Alexander Samsonov. Under pressure from their ally France, who was facing a powerful German invasion force in the west, it was decided that the 2nd Army would join the 1st Army as part of General Yakov Zhilinskiy's Northwestern Front where it would participate in the upcoming invasion of East Prussia. The combination of the 1st and 2nd Armies had a fatal flaw; Samsonov and the commander of the 1st Army, Paul von Rennenkampf, had had an antagonistic and hostile relationship since 1905.

== Eastern front ==
Between 7–9 August 1914 first the 1st and then the 2nd Army crossed the border into East Prussia, meeting little to no resistance. The 1st Army would engage the Germans at the battles of Stallupönen and Gumbinnen while the 2nd Army had remained unengaged, advancing to the south of the 1st Army.

=== Battle of Tannenberg ===
Following the failed German counterattack at the Battle of Gumbinnen and the subsequent German withdrawal, the 1st Army did not press on, allowing the 2nd Army to catch up but due to a breakdown in communication (partly due to the animosity of the two commanders) the 2nd Army was not made aware of this and so it continued to march on, a fatal move that would eventually expose the right flank of the 2nd Army. The 2nd Army was also experiencing severe supply shortages and along with the 1st Army a worsening communication situation as both armies had outrun their secure telegraph lines, were short of experienced telegraph operators and lacked cryptographic equipment. The result was that the Russians were now broadcasting their orders on unsecure lines, which were being intercepted and translated by German operators.

The 2nd Army was to continue its advance south of the 1st Army and German 8th Army before swinging north towards its objective of Seeburg, but with little to no effective communication there was little coordination between the two armies. While sluggish due to supply shortages, poor logistics, and misuse of railway lines, the 2nd Army's advance was relatively unopposed until 22 August when it encountered German forces all along its front. A number of successful thrusts were conducted, pushing the Germans back. On 23 August they succeeded in driving the German XX Corps back to a defensive line. A second push against the XX Corps on the 24th failed but the Germans withdrew to avoid being cut off. Samsonov saw this as a perfect opportunity to pursue and cut the XX Corps off and so began moving the 2nd Army in a northwesterly direction, changing his direction of attack and not informing Rennenkampf in the process. Seeing this opportunity and feeling safe on his flanks, he transferred the bulk of his force to the northwest, leaving a single corps, VI Russian Corps, to simultaneously hold the right flank and swing north to the objective of Seeburg and a single corps, I Russian Corps, to hold the left flank.

Unbeknown to Samsonov, the German command, who had been receiving intercepted Russian orders involving troop movements, had already shifted forces to the south to check his advance and when further orders were intercepted with news that he had changed his direction, German forces were able to adjust their positions and threaten the now exposed left and right flanks of the 2nd Army. With no communication between the two Russian armies, unsafe broadcasting of orders and the decision to change his direction of attack, the 2nd Army would find itself outflanked and cut off from mutual support from the 1st Army.

On 26 August the 1st Army approached Königsberg unopposed as the German forces had identified the 2nd Army as a more immediate threat and had withdrawn to the south in order to engage it. The VI Corps, whom Samsonov had left on its own to seize the objective of Seeburg, was met by the German XVII Corps around Seeburg and Bischofstein and was routed, exposing the 2nd Army's right flank and supply lines. Unaware that his right flank was now exposed, Samsonov pressed the 2nd Army on and repeatedly engaged the XX Corps. On the 27th the German I Corps engaged the Russian I Corps on the 2nd Army's left flank and threw it back. Samsonov diverted the Russian XIII Corps, which had been leading the northwestern thrust, to the southwest in an attempt to reinforce the 2nd Army's left flank but the decision came too late and like the right flank, the left flank was now exposed. Late on the 28th Samsonov finally realised the grave situation the 2nd Army was in with both flanks exposed. With the centre also facing critical supply shortages the assault was halted before an order to retreat to the southeast was given. Samsonov then requested that the 1st Army break-off its assault on Königsberg and assist the 2nd Army by covering its retreat.

The order to retreat and the request for assistance came too late to rescue the 2nd Army. The German I Corps had proceeded to move due east after breaking through the 2nd Army's left flank and had met the German XVII Corps that had continued in a southwesterly direction after breaking through the 2nd Army's right flank, cutting off the 2nd Army's route of retreat and pocketing it around Tannenberg. Throughout the 29th German artillery pounded the Tannenberg pocket and at some point on the 29th Samsonov shot himself. The shattered remnants of the 2nd Army surrendered on 30 August with some 90,000 Russian POWs being captured and with them the Russian 2nd Army ceased to exist as an effective unit.

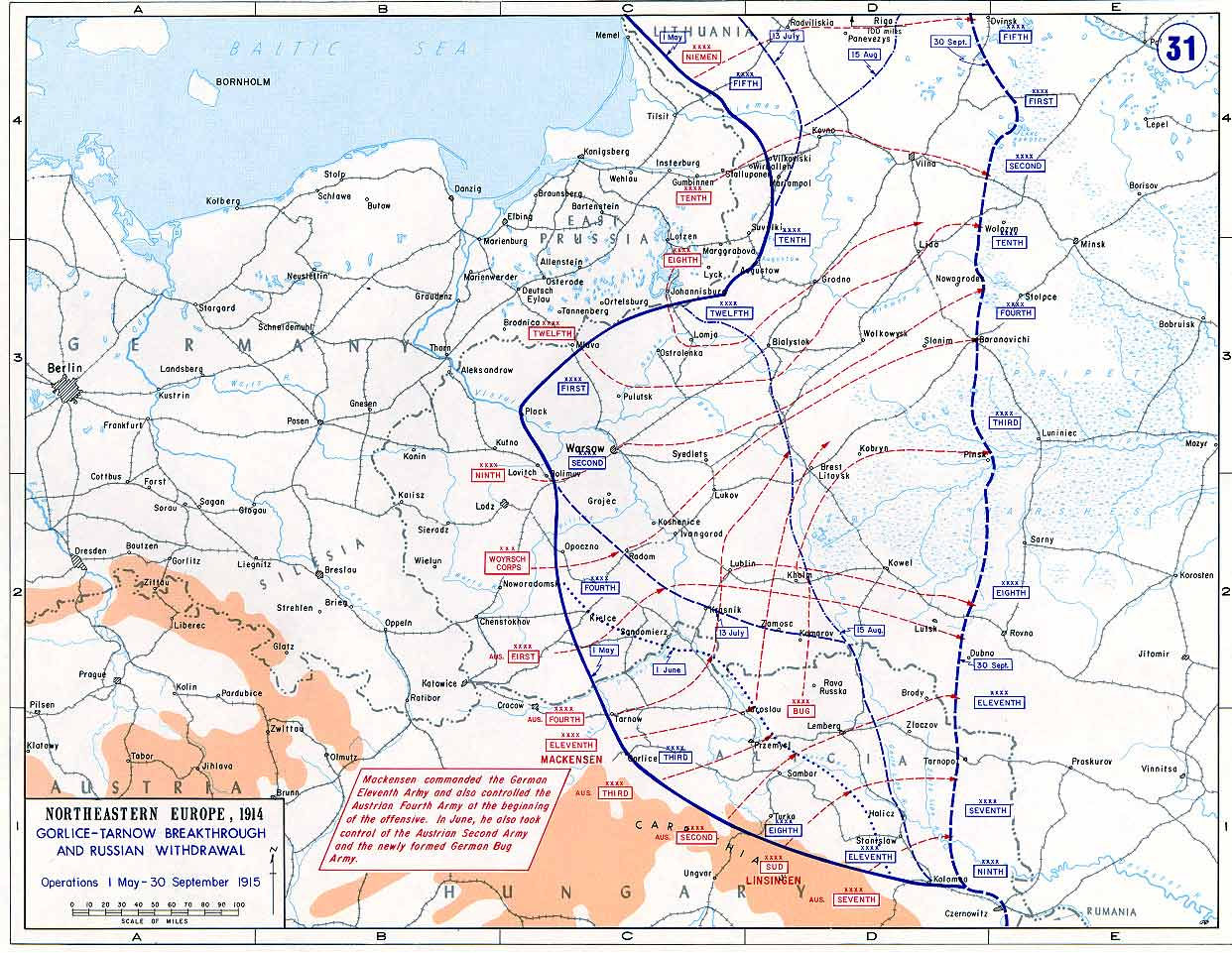
Map showing the operations on the Eastern Front during 1915, showing the Second Army located just to the west of Warsaw at the start of the year, and then just north of Minsk at the end of the year

However, not all of its units were destroyed, and the army remained in the line, participating in the First Battle of the Masurian Lakes in early September, 1914. It continued to participate in the fighting on the Eastern Front until the dissolution of the Imperial Russian Army in early 1918. In March 1916 the 2nd Army was responsible for conducting the Lake Naroch Offensive, which was unsuccessful and in which the army suffered heavy losses.

== Commanders ==
2nd Army
Appointed	Commander	Dismissed
19 June 1914	Cavalry General Alexander Vasilyevich Samsonov	30 August 1914
14 September 1914	Cavalry General Sergei Mikhailovich Scheidemann	12 December 1914
5 December 1914	Infantry General Vladimir Vasilyevich Smirnov	8 April 1917
8 April 1917	Lieutenant General Anthony Andreyvich Veselovsky	12 July 1917
12 July 1917	Infantry General Nikolai Alexandrovich Danilov	7 August 1917
6 August 1917	Lieutenant General Pyotr Dmitryvich Telezhnikov	22 August 1917
22 August 1917	Infantry General Nikolai Alexandrovich Danilov	20 November 1917
20 November 1917	Lieutenant General Aleksei Konstantinovich Baiov	24 December 1917
21 December 1917	Lieutenant A. Kiseylov	???
