= Western Front (Russian Empire) =

Major unit of the Imperial Russian Army during World War I

The Western Front (Russian: Западный фронт) was an army group in the armed forces of the Russian Empire during the First World War. It was established in August 1915 when the Northwestern Front was split into the Northern Front and Western Front, and was disbanded in 1918. From the time of its formation until the final year of its existence, the Western Front's field headquarters was in Smolensk, but it was later moved to Minsk.

== Composition ==
- Field Headquarters
- 1st Army (August 1915 - April 1916)
- 2nd Army (August 1915 - the beginning of 1918)
- 3rd Army (August 1915 - June 1916, July 1916 - early 1918)
- 4th Army (August 1915 - October 1916)
- 10th Army (August 1915 - the beginning of 1918)
- Special Army (August - September 1916, November 1916 - July 1917)

== Commander of the armies of the Western Front ==
- 04.08.1915 — 18.08.1915 — Mikhail Alekseyev
- 23.08.1915 — 11.03.1917 — Alexei Evert
- 11.03.1917 — 31.03.1917 — Vladimir Smirnov
- 31.03.1917 — 23.05.1917 — Vasily Gurko
- 31.05.1917 — 30.07.1917 — Anton Denikin
- 31.07.1917 — 05.08.1917 — Pyotr Lomnovsky
- 05.08.1917 — 12.11.1917 — Pyotr Baluyev
- 12.11.1917 — 11.1917 — Vasily Kamenshchikov
- 11.1917 — 1918 — Alexander Miasnikian

== See also ==
- List of Imperial Russian Army formations and units
- Western Front electoral district (Russian Constituent Assembly election, 1917)
