= Rawka (river) =

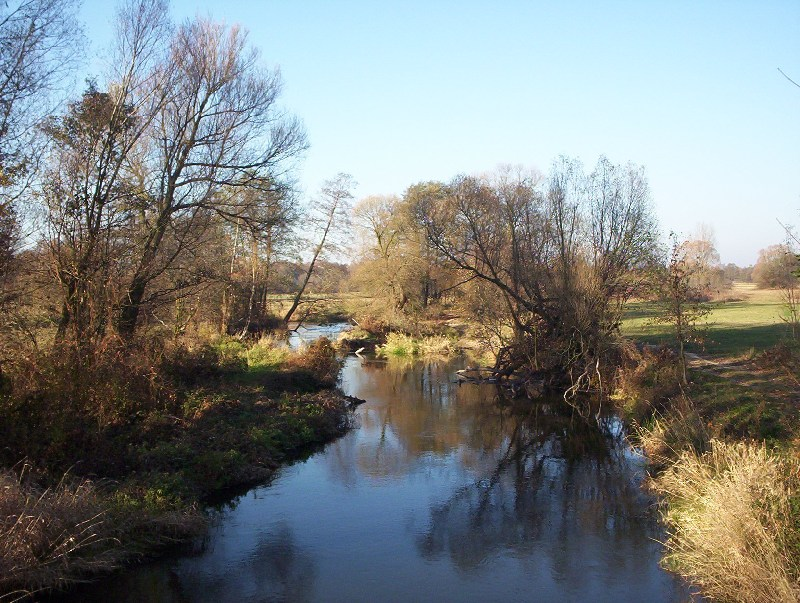
- Rawka river in Dolecko

Location
- Country: Poland

Physical characteristics
- Mouth
  - location: Bzura
  - coordinates: 52°08′32″N 20°06′45″E

Basin features
- Progression: Bzura→ Vistula→ Baltic Sea

The Rawka River is a river in central Poland, a right tributary of the Bzura river (which it meets between Łowicz and Sochaczew), with a length of 97 kilometres and the basin area of 1,192 km^{2}.
