= General of the Infantry (Russian Empire) =

Russian military rank from 1796 to 1917

General of the infantry
(Imperial Russian Army)

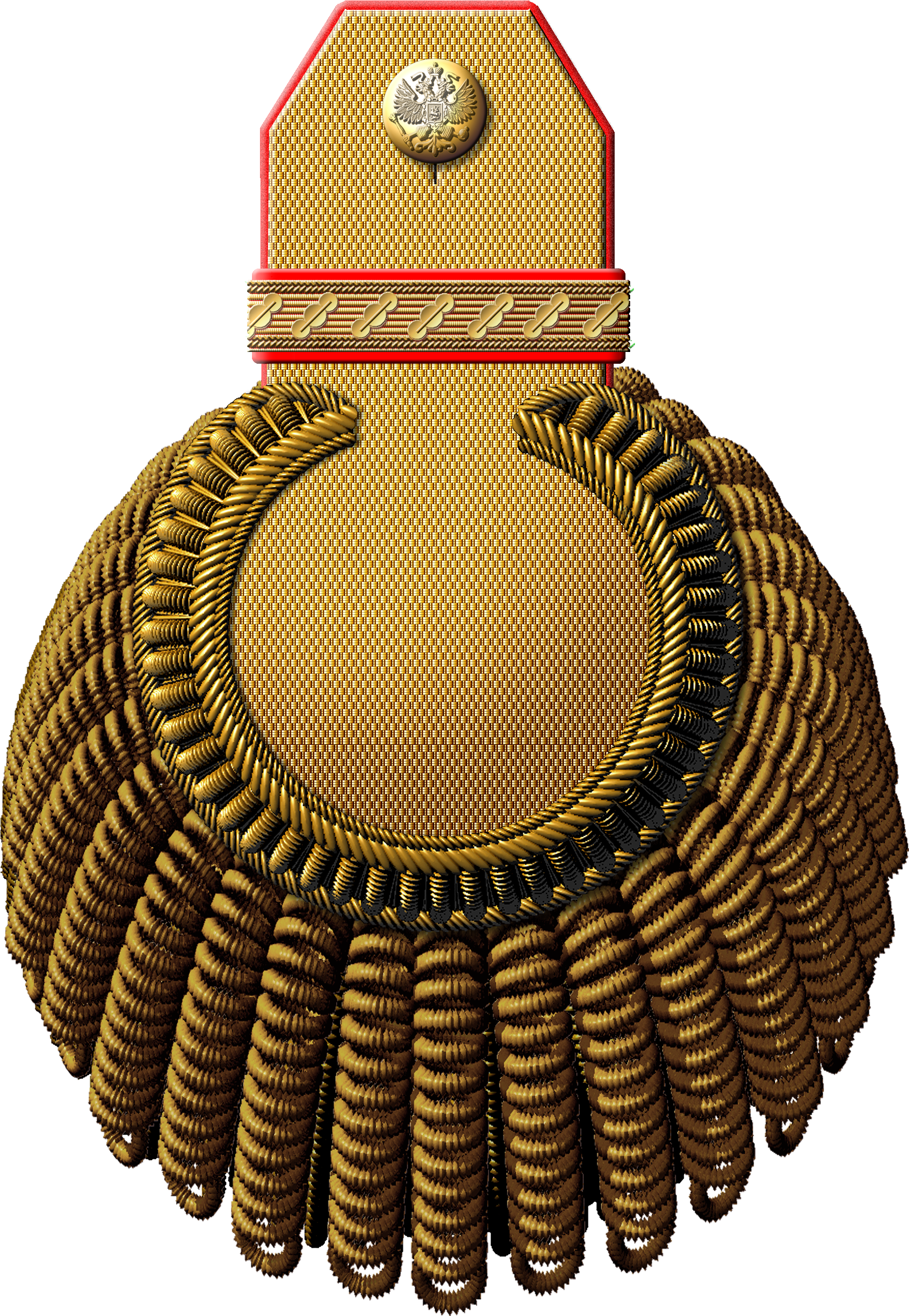
Epaulet
(1857-1907)

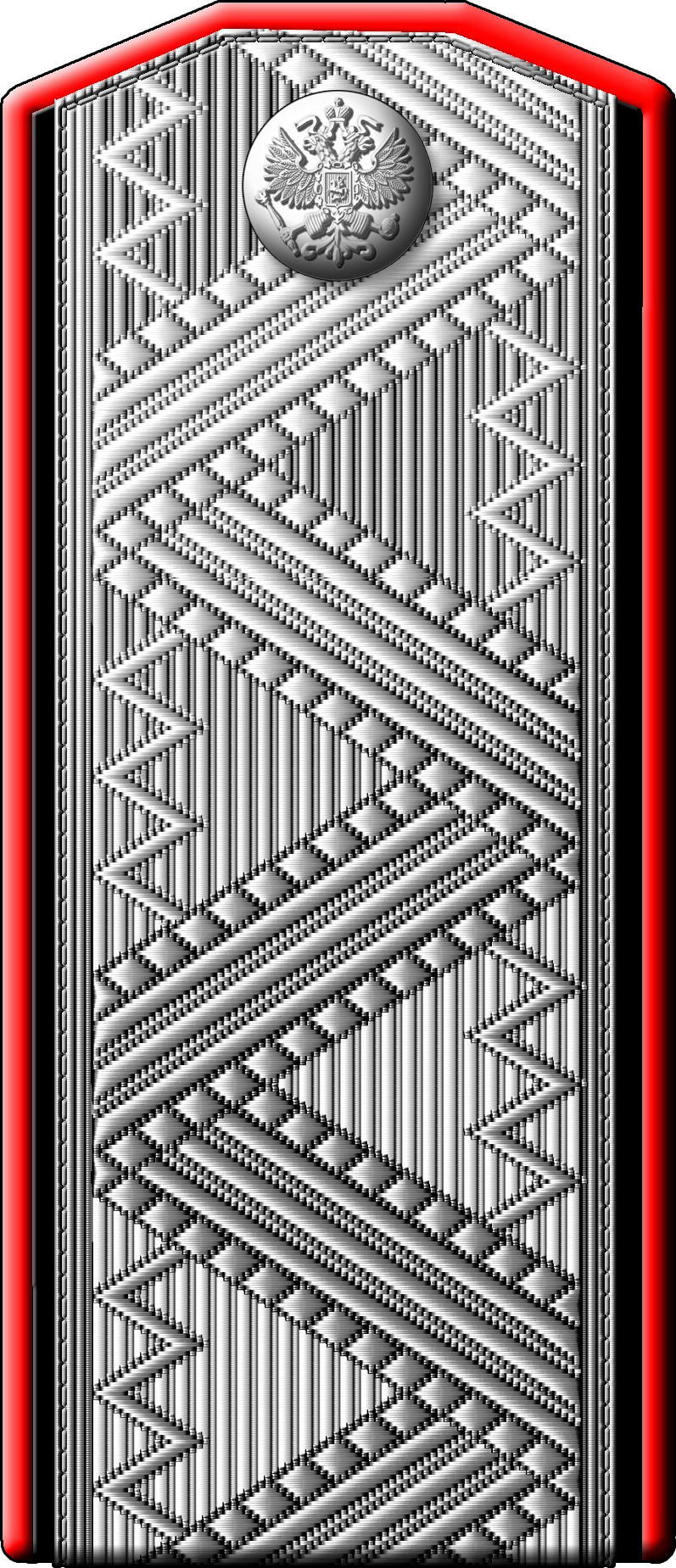
Shoulder strap
in the General staff (1904-1909

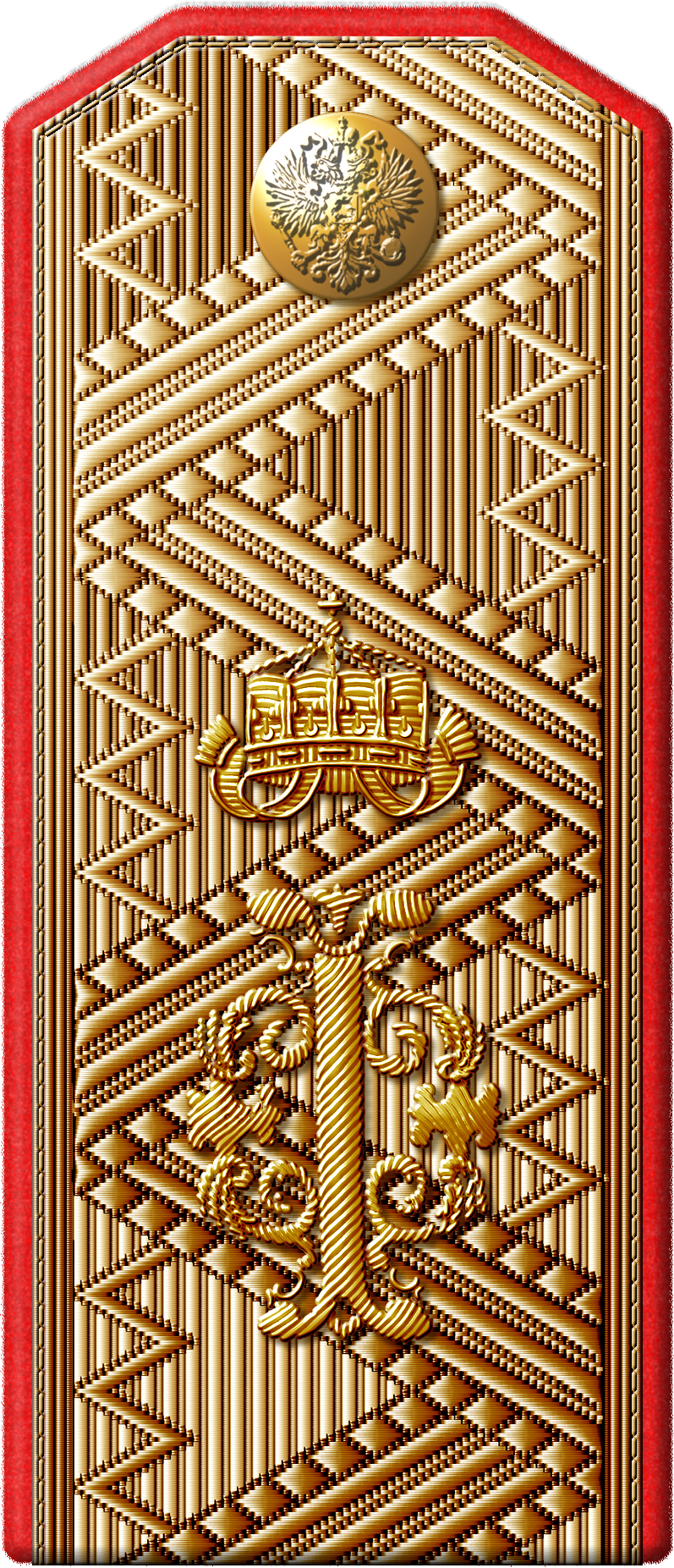
...as to the 54th inf. Regiment (1902-1915)

shoulder board

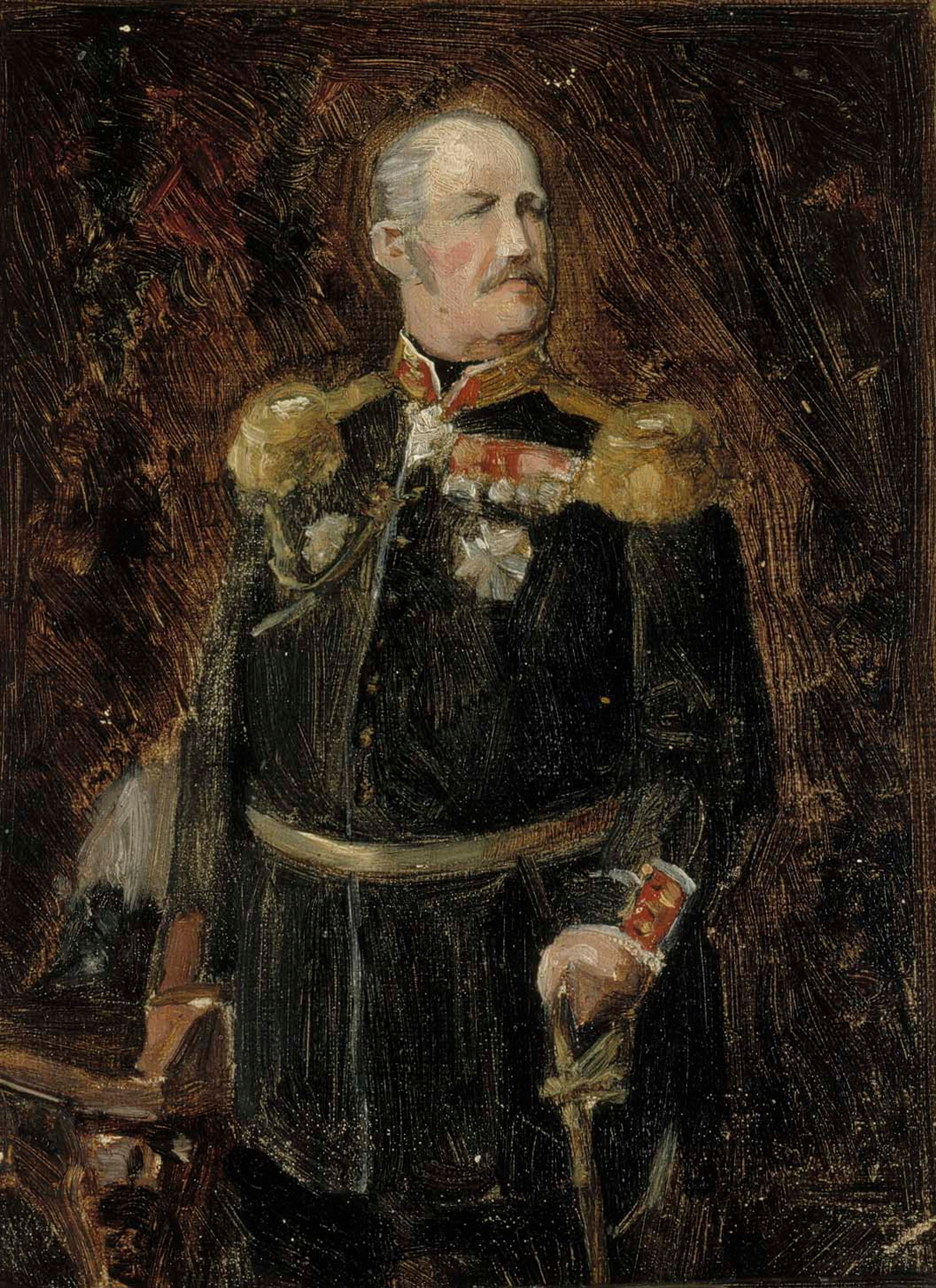
General of the Infantry, Count Adolf Aminoff.

General of the Infantry (Russian: генера́л от инфанте́рии) was a general of the branch rank in the Imperial Russian Army (today comparable to OF-8 rank level). It served as the rank below General-feldmarshal (Russian: генерал-фельдмаршал), and was the highest rank one could achieve in the infantry from 1796 to 1917.

== See also ==
- History of Russian military ranks
