= Grigory Gorchakov =

Imperial Russian Army officer (1886–1963)

Grigory Sergeevich Gorchakov
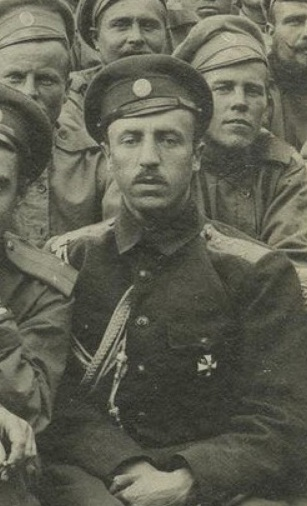
- Gorchakov in 1917
- Born: Grigory Sergeevich Grintser; 11 November [O.S. 29 October] 1886; Novomoskovsk, Yekaterinoslav Governorate, Russian Empire
- Died: 1 September 1963 (aged 76) Riga, Latvian SSR, Soviet Union
- Allegiance: Russian Empire; Russian SFSR; Soviet Union
- Branch: Imperial Russian Army; Red Army
- Service years: 1907–1917; 1918–1923; 1941–1945
- Rank: Podpolkovnik
- Conflicts: World War I; Lake Naroch offensive; Baranovichi offensive; Russian Civil War; Polish–Soviet War; World War II

Grigory Sergeevich Grintser (Gorchakov) (Russian: Григорий Сергеевич (Гринцер) Горчаков; 11 November [O.S. 29 October] 1886 (1888) – 1 September 1963) was an officer of the Imperial Russian Army who participated in World War I. He served in the Red Army during the Russian Civil War as a military specialist, later participating in World War II, as lieutenant colonel (1944).

== Biography ==
Grigory Sergeevich Grintser was born on 29 October 1886 in Novomoskovsk, to the family of the district zemstvo veterinarian Sergei Grigorievich Gorchakov; they were of the Russian Orthodox faith. From 1892, his family lived in Yekaterinoslav where he was sent to the city real school. In 1898, his family moved to Orenburg, where the realist continued his further education at the local city real school. At the end of 1901, after his father received an appointment to St. Petersburg, he transferred to another school, which became the 3rd real school of the capital. At first, his academic performance and behavior dropped, but later, having shown diligence, he completed the full course of the real school, including its additional 7th grade, which allowed admission to higher educational institutions.

Grigory chose military service and submitted documents to the St. Petersburg Infantry Cadet School in 1908 where he was refused without explanation. Nevertheless, that same year, he entered the junior class of the Kazan Infantry Cadet School. On 7 August 1909, he transferred to the senior class of the school. After completing his full course of study in 1910, he was released in the 2nd category with the rank of second lieutenant, with seniority from 6 August 1910 in the 88th Petrovsky Infantry Regiment, taking the position of assistant regimental adjutant and platoon commander in the regimental training team. The junior officer's service regiment was part of the 2nd Brigade of the 22nd Infantry Division and located in the Arakcheyev barracks of the Gruzino estate.

== World War I ==
On 18 July 1914, the 268th Poshekhonsky Infantry Regiment of the second line was formed from the cadre of the 88th Petrovsky Infantry Regiment, where he was sent to serve (VP from 25 October 1914). In November 1914, the regiment arrived at the Northwestern Front in the Skierniewice area of the Warsaw Governorate. By the highest order of 15 November 1914, he was awarded the next rank of lieutenant with seniority from 6 August 1914. On 14 November 1914, in a battle near the Bielawa settlement of the Lodz Voivodeship, he lieutenant was wounded twice, and evacuated to the officer's hospital of the Page Corps.

At the end of January 1915, he returned to service and reassigned to the 267th Dukhovshchinsky Infantry Regiment, to the position of regimental adjutant. For distinction in the battle near the village of Piotrovice, he was awarded the Order of St. Anna, 4th Class, with the inscription "for bravery" (VP 28.06.1915). For distinction in the battle near the village of Valevice, he was awarded the Order of St. Anna, 3rd Class, with swords and a bow (VP 08.09.1915).

By the end of 1915, the failures of the Imperial Russian Army at the front had caused widespread anti-German sentiment in Russia, and people with foreign surnames, like Grigory's father, filed petitions with the Senate to change their surnames. On 31 October 1915, his family received the highest permission to be renamed Gorchakov (Highest Order of 31 October 1915). On 14 November 1915, "for distinction in actions against the enemy," he was promoted to staff captain (seniority from 25 August 1915).

On 3 April 1916, he was officially reassigned to the 267th Dukhovshchinsky Infantry Regiment. On 21 April 1916, he was awarded the Order of St. Stanislaus, 3rd Class, with swords and a bow. He participated in the Lake Naroch and Baranovichi offensives and was shell-shocked. For his distinctions he was awarded the orders: St. Stanislaus, 2nd Class with swords, and St. Vladimir 4th Class with swords and bow (for distinction in the battle near the settlement of Belyava).

He was promoted captain on 11 December 1916. He successively held the positions of regimental adjutant, chief officer for assignments of the headquarters of the 67th Infantry Division (as of October 1916). At the headquarters of the Western Front in Minsk, he completed courses for senior officers, and was appointed to the newly formed 170th Infantry Division, senior adjutant of the headquarters. In the spring of 1917, he was transferred to the 35th Army Corps as head of corps intelligence. Later, he held the position of acting senior adjutant of the headquarters of the same corps. In August 1917, as one of the three best officers of the corps, he attended the General Staff Academy for accelerated training courses of the 3rd stage.

However, at the end of December 1917, he was unable to complete his studies at the academy, and dropped out due to illness.

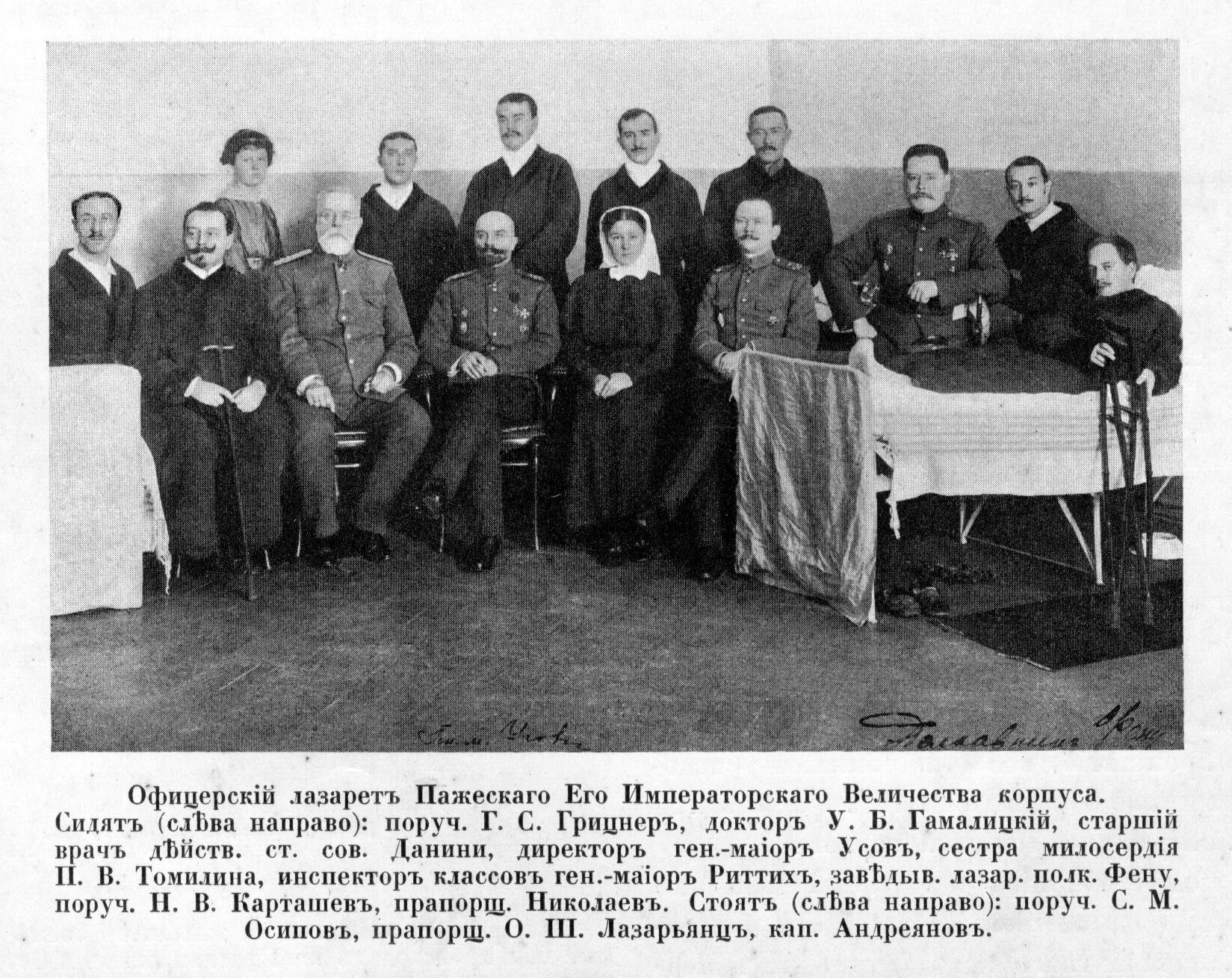
In the hospital, 1915

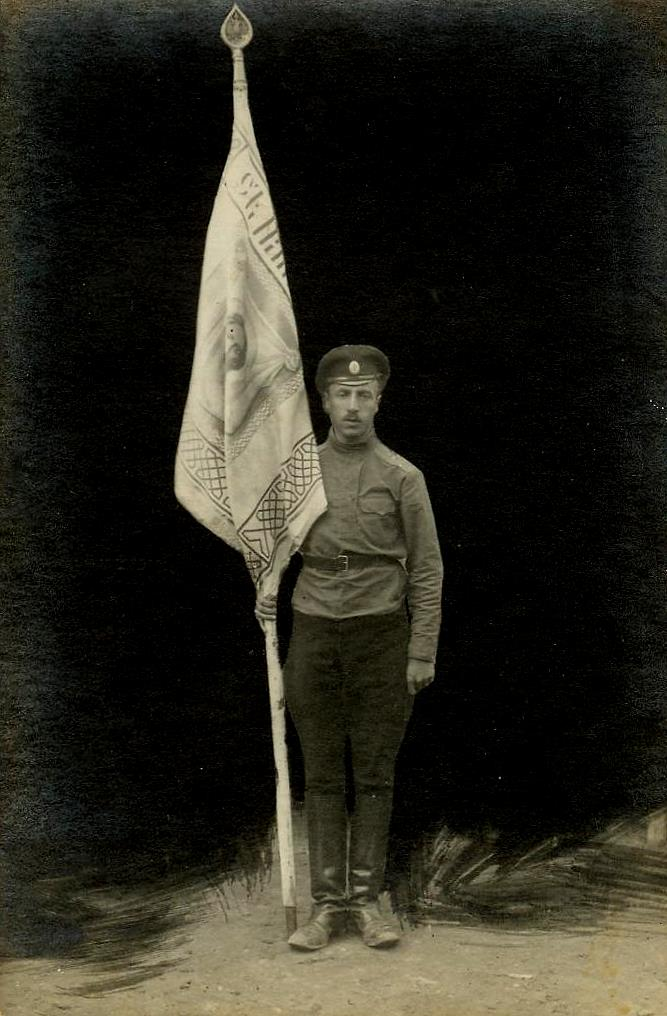
Lieutenant Grintser with the regimental banner, 1915.

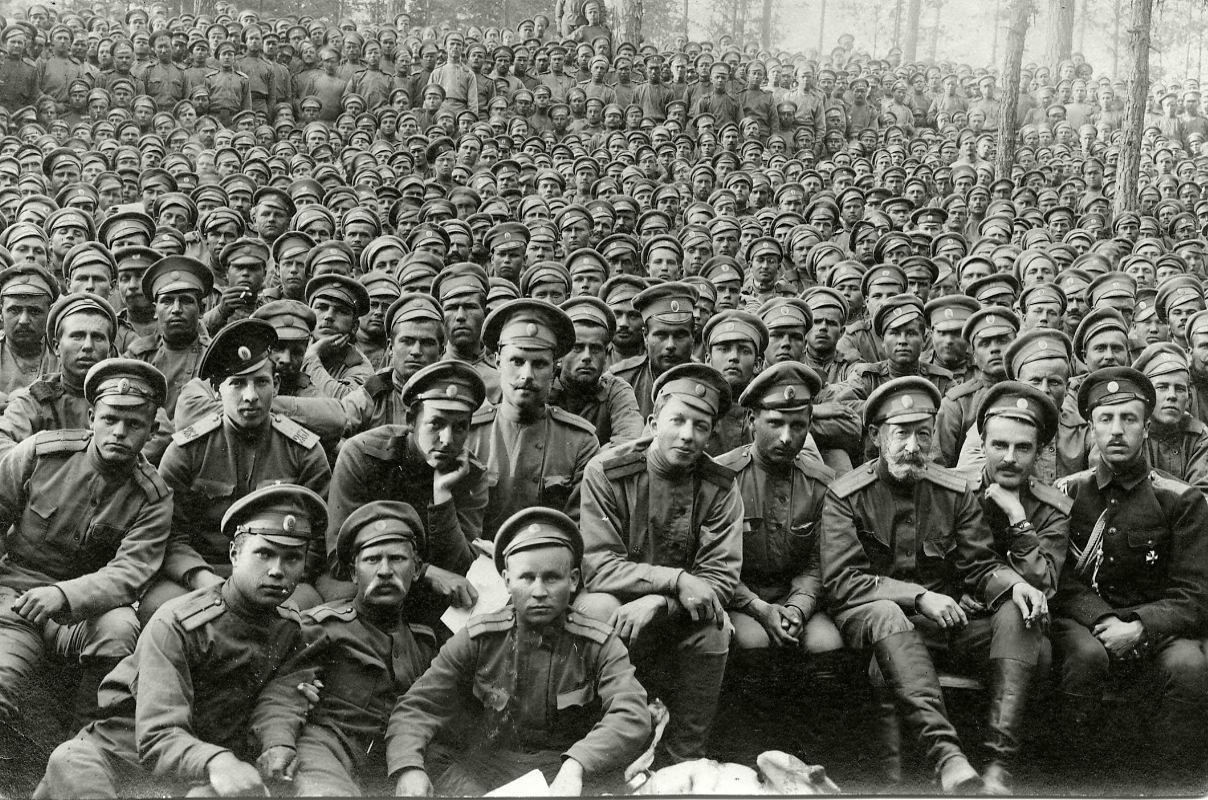
Gorchakov with aiguillette, in the first row on the right, 29 June 1916

== Russian Civil War ==
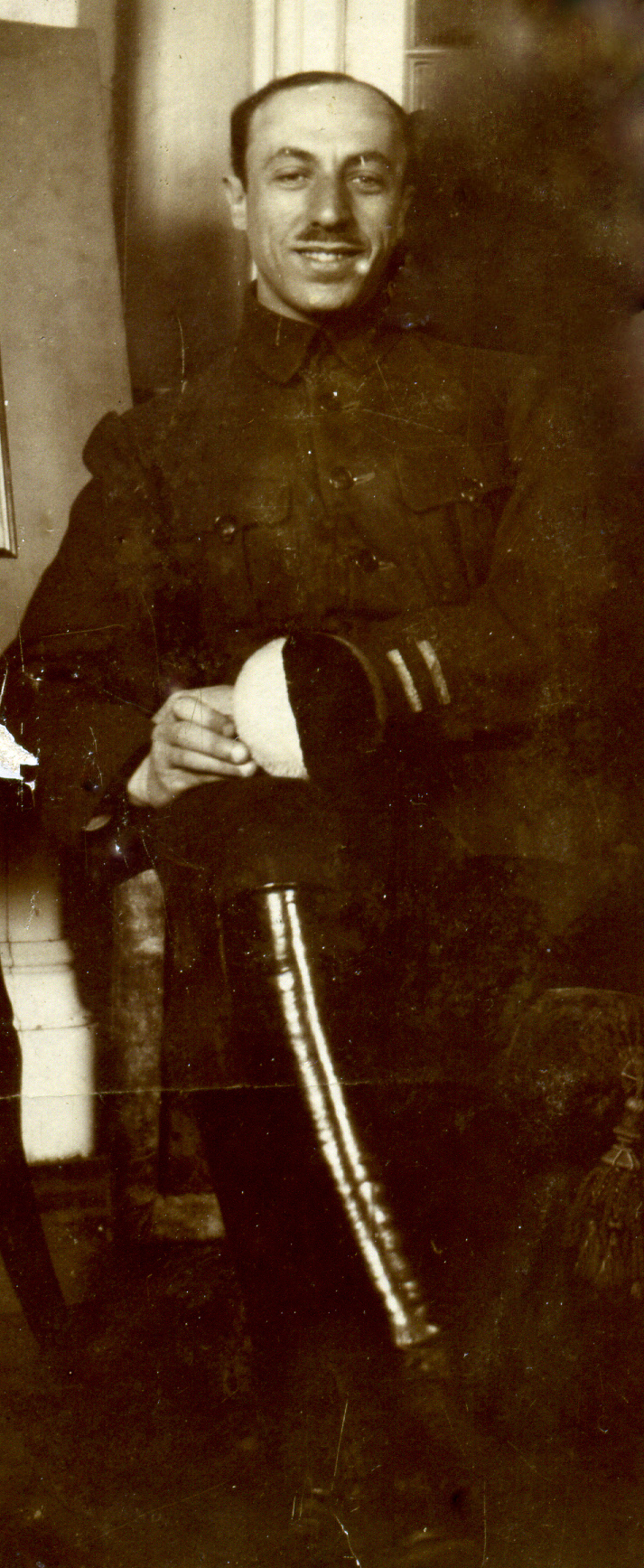
On the left sleeve of his jacket, he received two wound stripes

On 15 December 1917, he was dismissed from the army and received a job in the Railway Construction Directorate (NPKS) as a secretary. On 1 January 1919, he joined the Red Army as a military specialist and was assigned to the headquarters of the 8th Army.

In August 1919, he was at the headquarters of the 8th Army, and as part of Vladimir Selivachyov's army, participated in the Southern Front counteroffensive against Denikin's forces. The offensive was successful, and by 25 August the cities of Volchansk and Kupyansk were occupied, but by 26 August the situation had changed. Under the threat of encirclement, Kupyansk was abandoned, followed by Voronezh. During the time, the rear of the 8th Army of the Red Army came under attack from Konstantin Mamontov's cavalry units from 10 August to 19 September 1919.

On 7 September 1919, Selivachyov decided to transfer control of the military group to military specialists A. I. Rataysky and Gorchakov, appointing the latter as its chief of staff. Selivachyov himself went to the 8th Army, which found itself in the most difficult situation, where he assumed temporary command. Communication with the headquarters of the Southern Front was lost, and under threat of encirclement, parts of the military group began to retreat to the Novy Oskol area. During these events (September 16), the headquarters of the Southern Front received a telegram from Lenin, in which he shared his fears of possible betrayal on the part of Selivachyov and his division commanders. On 17 September, Selivachyov suddenly died of typhus, and the very next night, Nashtarm A. S. Nechvolodov and his wife defected from the 8th Army headquarters to the Whites. On 20 September, units of the 8th Army abandoned Kostomarovka and Kursk. By 30 September, the Whites had reoccupied Voronezh and Liski. At the same time, Mamontov's corps made its second raid on the Red rear. The 8th Army was under threat of complete defeat, and many high-ranking military specialists left their service. Only from 2 October to 6 October 1919 did the following defect to the Whites: the head of the army intelligence department, V. A. Zheltyshev, the acting chief of staff of the army, V. F. Tarasov, the head of the army operations department, B. P. Lapshin, and the chief of the army rear staff, V. V. Vdovyev-Kabardintsev.

On 24 October 1919, units of the 8th Army with the support of Budyonny's Cavalry Corps, finally occupied Voronezh. Gorchakov was finally granted leave to improve his health, but by the of end December 1919 returned to staff work, taking up the post of chief of the operational department of the 8th Army. The military specialist's further combat path was associated with the Rostov-Novocherkassk, Don-Manych, and North Caucasian operations, ending with the complete defeat of the Whites in Novorossiysk.

=== Turkestan Front ===
In the autumn of 1920, Gorchakov was transferred to Central Asia to the Turkestan Front. From 18 September 1920 to 3 October 1921, he held the position of 1st assistant to the chief of staff of the Turkestan Front under the chief of staff of F. P. Shafalovich. The commander of the Turkestan Front at that time was his former colleague from the 8th Army, Grigory Sokolnikov, followed by V. S. Lazarevich. Gorchakov took an active part in the development and implementation of military operations of the Red Army units against the Basmachi.

== Polish–Soviet War ==
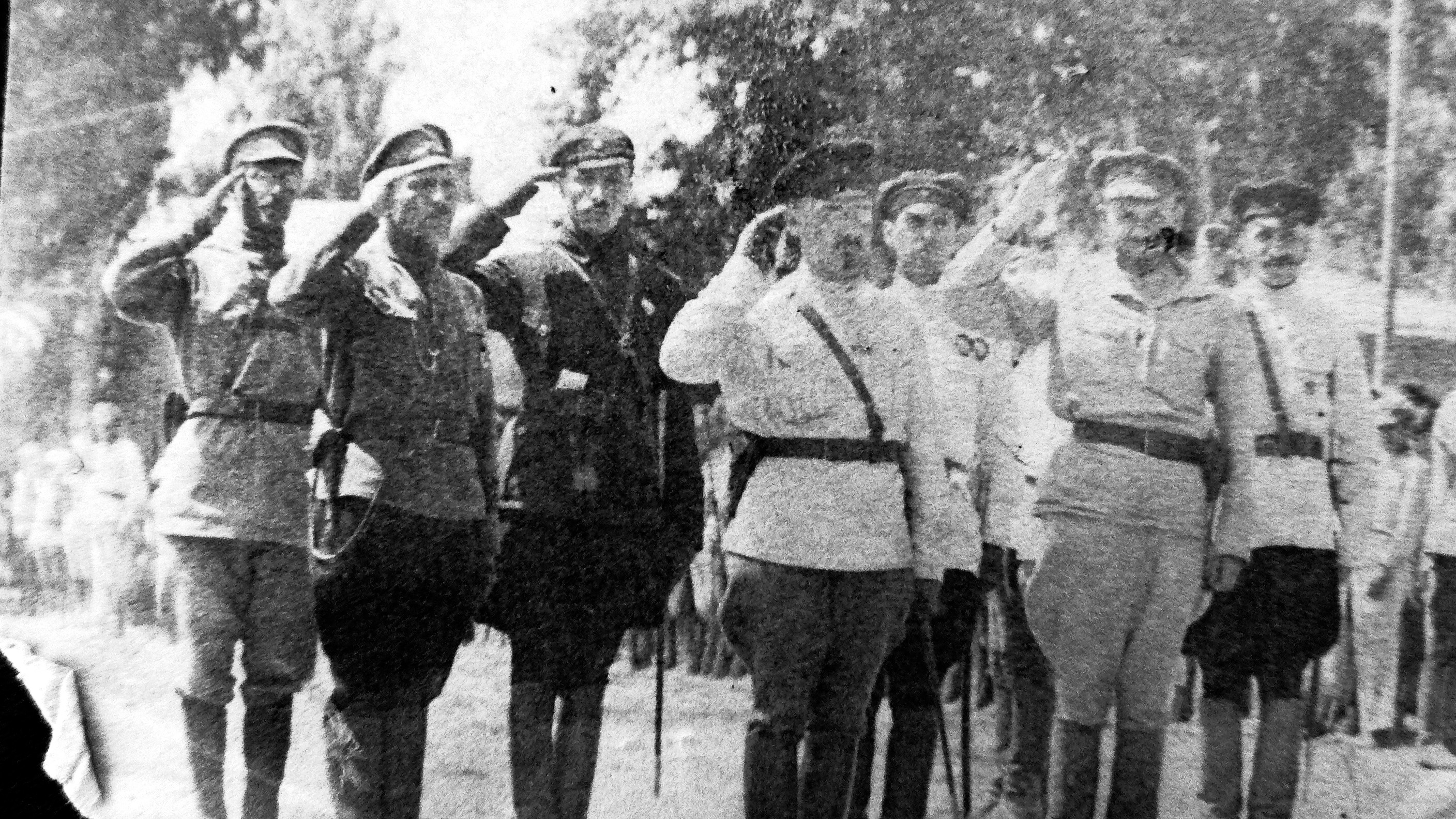
Gorchakov third from the left, summer 1920

At the end of May 1920, Gorchakov took up the post of Chief of the Operations Directorate of the 4th Army of the Western Front of the RSFSR. He was part of the lead army group during the July offensive operation. On 10 July and 13 July 1920, he signed operational orders for the 4th Army. On 14 July 1920, the Army's troops occupied Vilnius. On 19 July 1920, during a deep outflanking maneuver, Gai's 3rd Cavalry Corps, also part of the 4th Army, occupied the fortress city of Grodno. This event was a big surprise for both the enemy and the Red Army leadership. The next day, the 9th and 17th Infantry Divisions and 3 Uhlan Regiments of the enemy were sent from Bialystok to help the besieged garrison. Despite this, the 4th Army headquarters needed to be made aware of the events due to the lack of communication with G. D. Gaia. The 4th Army Commander, E. N. Sergeev, was in Vilnius and was conducting diplomatic negotiations with the Lithuanian authorities at the time to determine the latter's further actions. By 22 July, there was still no communication with G. D. Gaia, and the soldiers of the cavalry corps left without support, were engaged in the heaviest street battles in dismounted formation. Then, units of the corps began to lose the positions they had occupied, gradually retreating to the Neman River.

At the same time, the main forces of the 4th Army stopped at the distant approaches to Grodno, fulfilling the directive of the 4th Army Commander No. 1058. Concerned about the prolonged lack of communication with the cavalry corps, the 4th Army Commander sent his trusted and authoritative person to Grodno. The head of the Operations Directorate, Gorchakov, became the head of the Operations Directorate and immediately left for Grodno by car. He arrived at the headquarters of the 3rd Cavalry Corps on horseback. In the area of Grendychi, his car got stuck in the sand and was then fired upon by enemy artillery. Directive to the troops No. 1058/20.06.1920 was no longer relevant to the situation that had developed at that time. After a meeting at the headquarters of the Cavalry Corps, Gorchakov took responsibility for the regrouping of the divisions of the 4th Army. As a result of the regrouping of the units, strategic success was achieved. On 23 July 1920, after heavy fighting, Grodno was recaptured from the Polish forces. For the successful conduct of the Grodno operation, the Chief of the Operational Directorate of the 4th Army, Gorchakov was awarded the Order of the Red Banner of the RSFSR No. 97 (Order of the Revolutionary Military Council No. 458/1920) and Certificate No. 1564.

After capturing Grodno, the 4th Army of the Red Army continued its successful offensive to the west. Within a short time, its units occupied the cities of Osowiec, Lomza, Mlawa, Ciechanow, and others. Shortly before the start of the Battle of Warsaw, the command of the Western Front carried out another rotation of army commanders. Instead of Sergeyev, Aleksandr Shuvayev took over as army commander under the authority of Veger E. I., Gorchakov took over as chief of staff. Further events developed tragically: from 14 to 16 August 1920, Polish troops launched a series of counterattacks against the Red Army of the Western Front. Thus, on the night of 15 August, the enemy's 5th Army cavalry struck the gap between the 4th Army and the retreating 15th Army and occupied the suburbs of Ciechanów. Due to the threat of the 4th Army headquarters being captured, the army commander, a member of the Revolutionary Military Council, hastily left the city by car, heading north to their units in Mława. Some army headquarters workers, taking up to 50 rifles from the supply train, also made a breakthrough to Ostrołęka. Still, they destroyed the 4th Army's radio station during the retreat. Although Ciechanów was recaptured from the enemy the next day, the loss of the radio station caused further difficulties in the management of the 4th Army. On 18 August, Pilsudski's 5th Army, having broken the resistance of the main forces of the RSFSR, launched a strong counteroffensive, forcing the 15th, 3rd, and 16th Armies to retreat to the east. Shuvaev-Gorchakov's 4th Army was in a challenging situation; its units were advanced far to the west, occupying a vast front of the Polish Corridor. The army commander and chief of staff were in Sierpets on 19 August, having contacted Tukhachevsky from the headquarters of the 54th Rifle Division. On 20 August, in Drobin, they met with corps commander Gai, giving orders on the retreat routes of the cavalry corps and a request for cover for the 53rd Division. On 21 August, the headquarters of the 4th Army arrived in Mlawa and was then in the 12th Rifle Division. Communication between the headquarters of the 4th Army and its divisions was interrupted and was never restored. By 25 August, the defeated units of the 4th Army, after continuous battles in encirclement, crossed the border of East Prussia where they were interned. Only small remnants of six regiments from the 12th Infantry Division, alongside the headquarters of the 4th Army were able to emerge from encirclement into operational space.

== At the Red Army Academy ==
In October 1921, by order of the commander-in-chief, he was sent to serve in the Military Academy of the Red Army. Until 1 June 1922, he held the positions of head of the Military Scientific Department and assistant to the manager of all military academies of the Red Army. He wrote several military and scientific articles on Turkestan issues. He was elected a permanent member of the Central Asian Military Scientific Society. On 1 June 1922, he was demobilized at his request.

== Red Army reserves and arrest ==
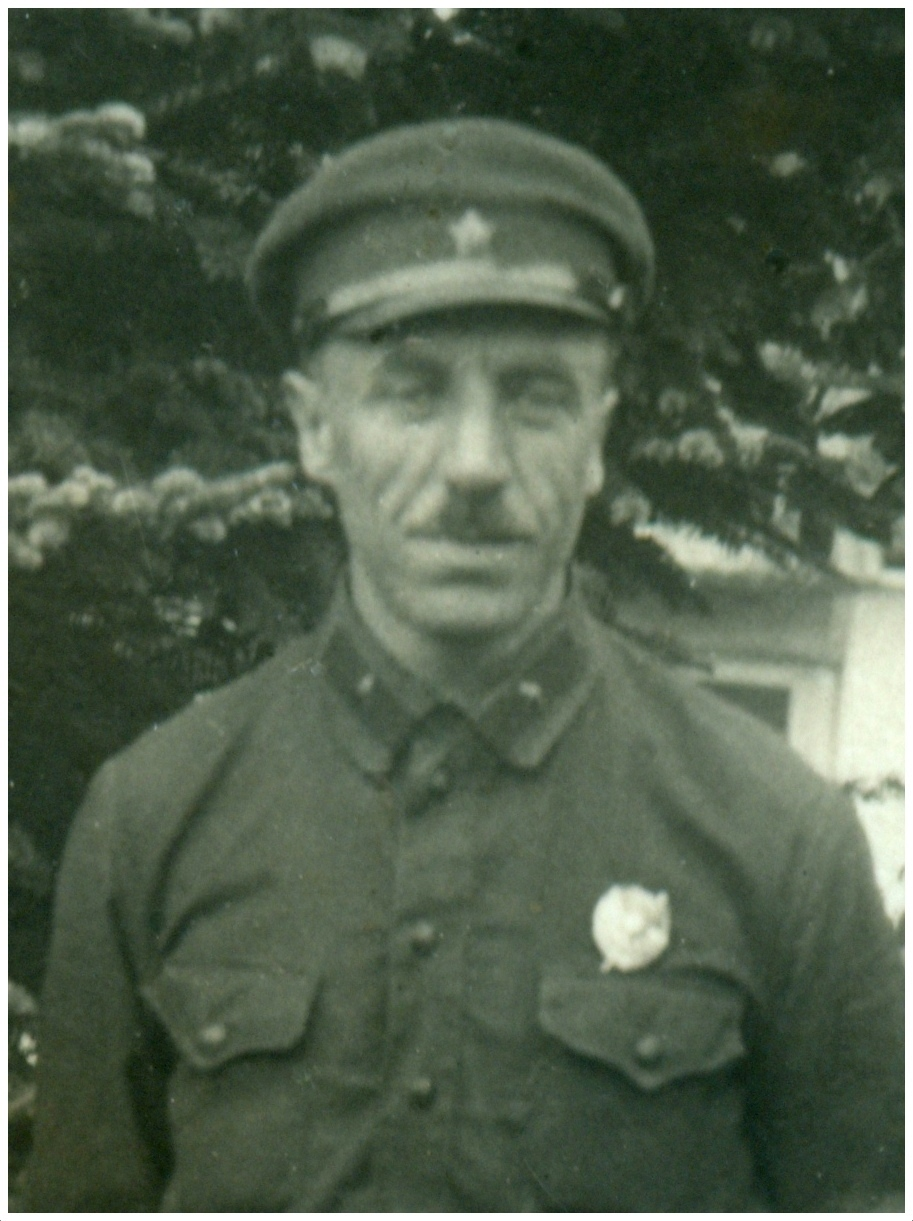
Gorchakov in 1933

On 1 June 1922, Gorchakov was accepted to the service in the Tax and State Revenue Department of the People's Commissariat of Finance of the RSFSR as Deputy Manager of the General Department. This appointment was made possible thanks to the assistance of his former army comrade, Grigory Sokolnikov, who then held the post of Deputy People's Commissar of Finance of the RSFSR. In 1923, he married Sylvia Bargais, an employee of the Narkomfin office. In 1927, he was registered as head of the 2nd subdepartment in the Naval Reporting Department, Financial Control Department of the People's Commissariat of Finance of the USSR. In 1930, he was transferred to the Main Directorate for the Preparation of Industry for Air Defense of the Supreme Council of the National Economy of the USSR, renamed in 1932 to the Directorate of Air Defense and Paramilitary Special Units of the People's Commissariat of Trade Unions of the USSR, head of the Air Defense Department. In 1937, Gorchakov was arrested on fabricated charges, which was reclassified as a general criminal case during the investigation. On 27 March 1937, he was sentenced eight years to a penal camp. By the Decree of the Central Executive Committee of the USSR on 7 September 1937, he was deprived of the Order of the Red Banner of the RSFSR. After the start of World War II, Gorchakov was released and sent to one of the military units of the Red Army.

== World War II ==
From September 1941, he participated in the defense of Moscow without an officer's rank (as he had yet to pass recertification). In December 1941, after his criminal record was cleared, he was sent to Kazan to one of the reserve units being formed. The 120th Rifle Division also belonged to this type of unit, in which he continued his further service. Then, he was sent to the Frunze Combined Arms Academy for accelerated training courses for reserve command personnel. His studies were completed in May 1942, when the graduate was awarded the rank of captain (Order of the Moscow Military District No. 01029 of 25 May 1942). Returning to the Division, Gorchakov took up the post of assistant to the chief of the 1st section of its headquarters. In June 1942, the 120th Division was transferred along the Volga River to the Tatishchevsky District of the Saratov Oblast. On 25 August 1942, after a 400-kilometer combined march, it consolidated its position in the Pichuga ravine area of the Stalingrad region, becoming part of the 66th Army of the Stalingrad Front. From 4 September 1942, it took part in the Battle of Stalingrad, where its active operations held back significant enemy forces in the Sukhaya Mechetka ravine area for 40 days. According to data from the "Brief Combat History of the 120th Rifle Division" compiled by Captain Gorchakov, the Germans suffered over 6,000 casualties.

In contrast, the 120th Division suffered 5,600 deaths and wounded. On 7 November 1942, the Division became part of the 24th Army of the Don Front. After moving to the Kachalinskoye - Krivoe Lake area, the Division took part in the subsequent dissection of Field Marshal Paulus's encircled group. Following the enemy's defeat, Captain Gorchakov, one of the distinguished soldiers, was awarded the Order of the Red Star.

For its military distinctions, the 24th Army was renamed the 4th Guards Army in February 1943, and the 120th Rifle Division, which was part of it, was also renamed the 69th Guards Rifle Division. On 14 February 1943, by Order of the Don Front No. 0123, the assistant to the chief of the 1st section of the division headquarters was awarded the next rank of Guards Major. On 30 May 1944, by Order of the 4th Guards Army No. 0204, he was awarded the rank of Guards Lieutenant Colonel, with appointment to the post of chief of the 1st section (Operational) of the 80th Guards Rifle Division.

On 7 October 1944, by Order No. 0472 of the 4th Guards Army, he was transferred to the 5th Guards Airborne Division (commander - Major General P. I. Afonin), with the appointment to the post of its chief of staff. On 3 November 1944, by Decree of the Presidium of the Supreme Soviet of the USSR, he was awarded the 2nd Order of the Red Banner. On 20 April 1945, by Order of the troops of the 3rd Ukrainian Front, he was awarded the 3rd Order of the Red Banner. While holding responsible staff positions in the 20th and 21st Guards Rifle Corps, Guards Lieutenant Colonel Gorchakov was awarded many state awards. He had a long combat history, participating in the Znamenskaya, Kirovograd, Belgorod-Kharkov, Uman-Botoşani, Iasi-Kishinev, Budapest, Balaton, and Vienna military operations. At the war's end, he found himself in the Austrian city of Sankt Pölten. After the end of the war, the 5th Guards Airborne Division was renamed the 112th Guards Rifle Division, in which Gorchakov continued to hold the post of chief of staff of the division until 1 July 1945.

== Post-war years ==
On 1 January 1946, Grigory Sergeevich was demobilized. Upon returning to Moscow, he got a job in the office of the USSR Prombank as deputy head of the audit department. His ex-wife had renounced her husband back in 1937 when she was living in Latvia. Relations with his biological daughters did not work out, and he had to rent a room in Kuntsevo. In mid-1947, he moved to Riga. In 1950, he married the widow T. I. Gorlanova and raised an adopted daughter. He worked as the director of the Riga Factory Training School No. 4. From 13 June 1953, in the Labor Reserves Department under the Council of Ministers of the LSSR, head of the department, then deputy head. Gorchakov died on 1 September 1963; his burial place is in the Riga Garrison Cemetery.

== Personal life ==
He was married three times. His first marriage was to Zykov E. A. (1892–1923), with whom he had two daughters, Svetlana (1922–xxxx) and Ekaterina (1923–2018). In his second marriage to Bargais S. A. (1900–1977), they had a son named Harry (1924–2019). His third marriage was to Gorlanova T. I. (1906–1985). He had an older sister, Natalya Sergeevna Popova (1885–1975), who was a mathematician, and a younger brother, Alexander Sergeevich Gorchakov (Grintzer) (1888–1967), who served as the head of the chancery of the Astrakhan governor in 1916. Additionally, his cousin, Grigory Mikhailovich Grintser (Grigoriev), held the rank of lieutenant colonel in the Imperial Russian Army, serving as quartermaster of the 50th Infantry Division in 1917.
