= 267th Dukhovshchinsky Infantry Regiment =

Infantry regiment of the Imperial Russian Army

- 267-й пехотный Духовщинский полк
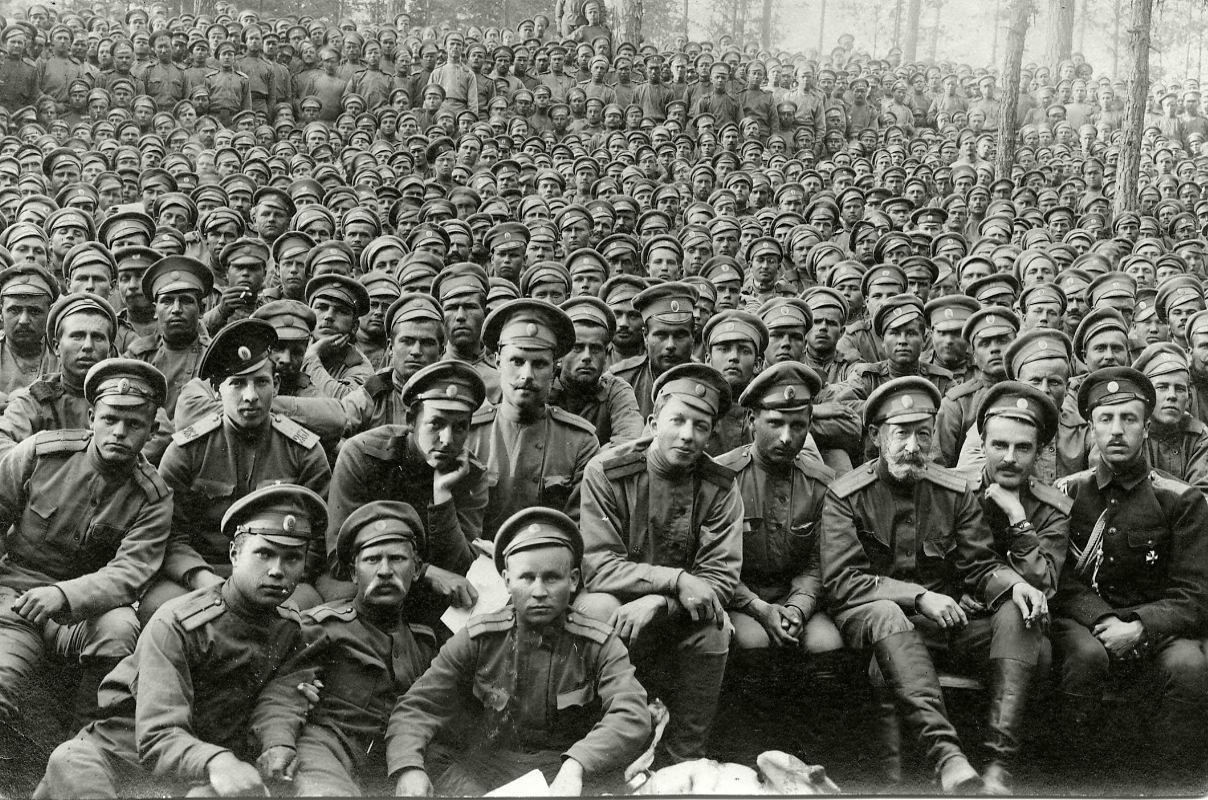
- 267th Dukhovshchinsky Regiment, 29 June 1916
- Active: 1914–1918
- Country: Russian Empire; Russian Republic (from 1917)
- Branch: Imperial Russian Army; Russian Army (from 1917)
- Type: Infantry
- Part of: 35th Army Corps: 67th Infantry Division
- Engagements: World War I; Vilno-Dvinsk offensive; Lake Naroch offensive; Baranovichi offensive

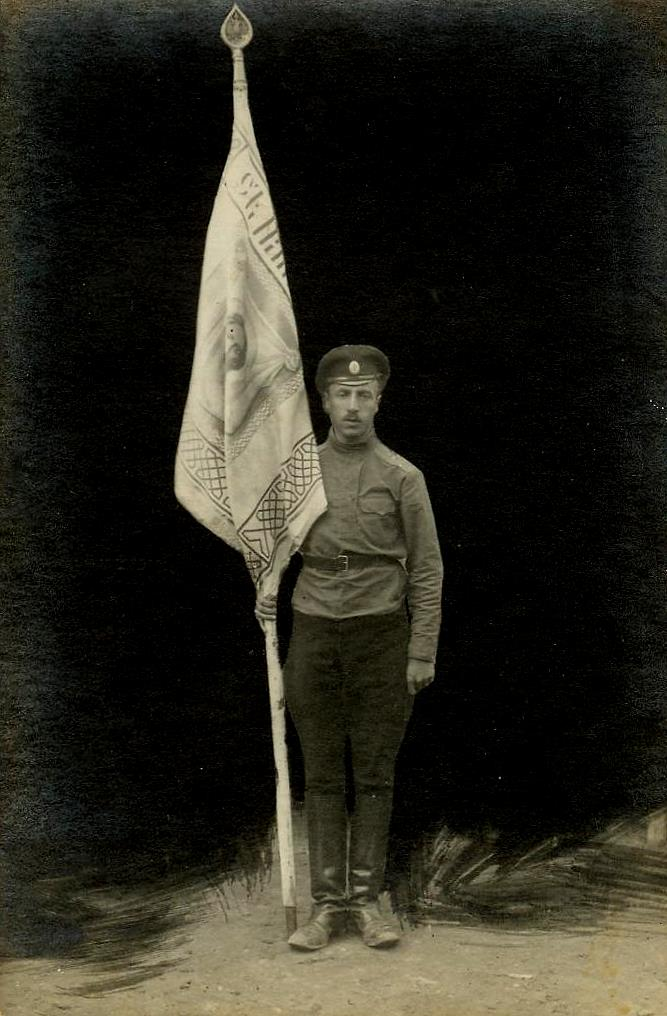
Banner of the 267th Dukhovshchinsky Infantry Regiment. Lieutenant Grintser G.S., 1915)

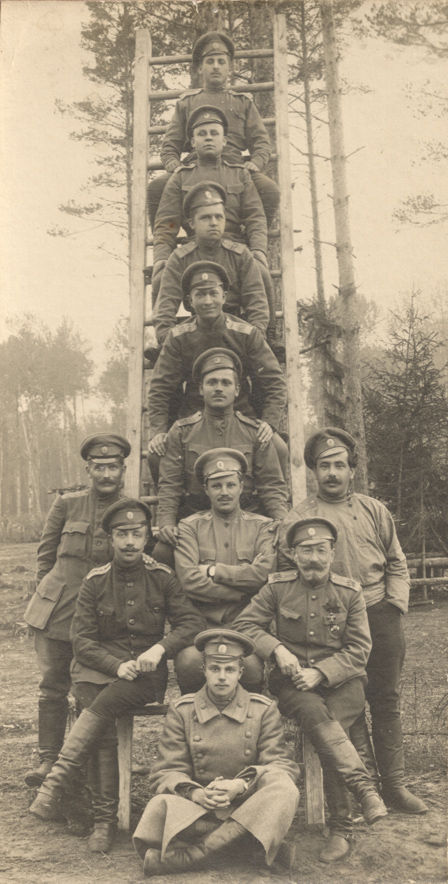
Center (from top to bottom): warrant officers Boldyrev, Perednya-Peredkov, Artyomov, Bogdanov, Sakovich, Popov, Vasich. Left: Staff Captain Raun, Staff Captain Molodtsov. Right: Lieutenant Tuzhov, Lieutenant Colonel Chudinov. 1916

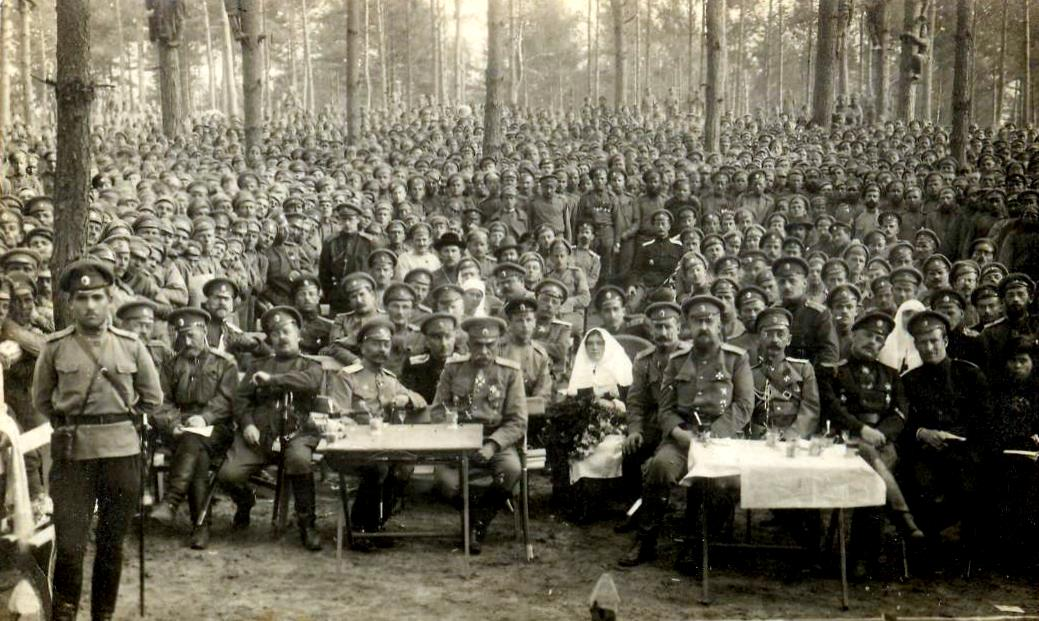
67th Infantry Division. 1916

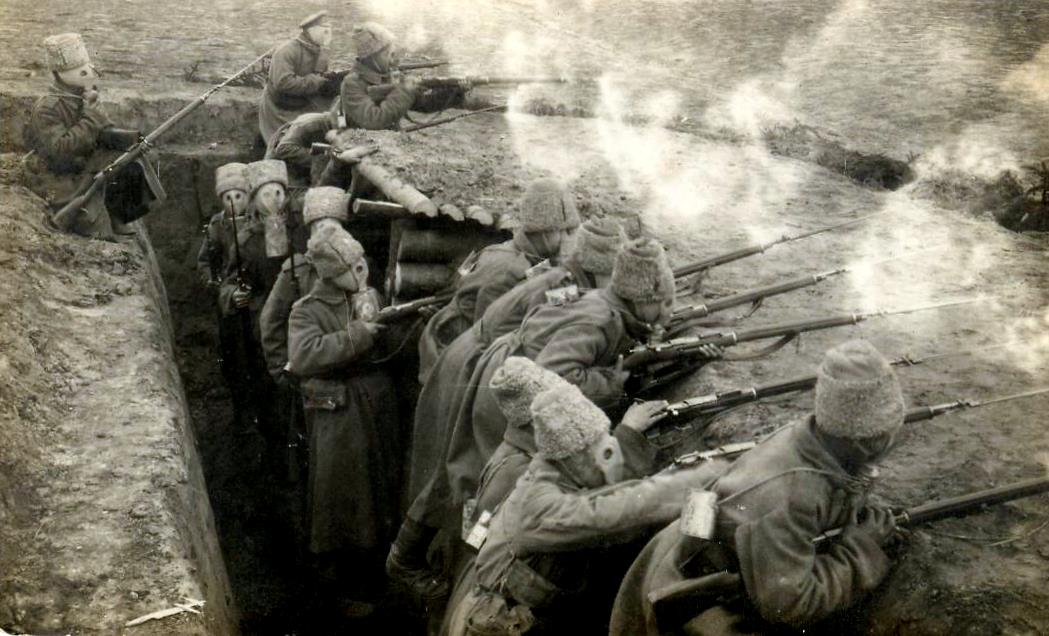
Soldiers of the regiment wearing Zelinsky-Kummant gas masks, 1916

The 267th Dukhovshchinsky Infantry Regiment (Russian: 267-й пехотный Духовщинский полк) was an infantry regiment of the Imperial Russian Army.

The regiment was formed upon mobilization on 18 July 1914 during World War I. The regiment was stationed in Novgorod Governorate in Gruzino. The cadre is 25 officers of the Neishlot 87th Infantry Regiment, the rank and file are beneficiaries from the reserve. In fall of 1914, the regiment was included in the Petrograd Military District. Until October 1914 it was stationed in Okhta and sent to the Northwestern Front.

== Service ==
Arriving on 11 November 1914 at the place of combat deployment southeast of Łowicz, the regiment became part of the 67th Infantry Division, 6th Army Corps, 1st Army. The first battles took place during the attack on the Bielawa settlement, which was part of the Lodz operation. According to the “Russian Invalid”, the regimental group was occupied by the enemy's trenches, crossing the Mroga and Belyava rivers. At the same time they managed to gain a foothold in this position, capturing one headquarter officer, four chief officers, and thirty five lower ranks. Being in positions near the village of Kurabki from 6 December to 8 December, the regiment repelled enemy attacks. Following the enemy breakthrough that occurred, the Russian units suffered irreparable losses, and the commander of the regiment was captured.

After a heavy defeat, the regiment received reinforcements, and participated in local battles. In beginning of 1915, the regiment held the defense in the Volya-Shidlovskaya area. In February 1915, the regiment was in the reserve of the 2nd Army of the Northwestern Front. In March 1915, the regiment occupied defenses near the Ravka River, along the Skierniewitz - Bolimov line. On 30 April 1915, the 67th Division was incorporated into the 35th Army Corps. In May 1915, the regiment was stationed in the Wola Szydłowska area. In beginning of July 1915, under the threat of encirclement, elements of the regiment made a systematic retreat to the Zhirardov area, and on 20 July, took up positions along the right bank of the Vistula. On 3 August 1915, the regiment drove the enemy out of the village of Zolotki, where for two days they covered the withdrawal routes of the army's right flank across the Nurets River. From 20 to 22 August 1915, despite the withdrawal of the neighboring division, the regiment held its position near the town of Mstibovo, allowing the 67th Division to carry out a night counterattack. On 9 August 1915, bloody battles continued near the village of Partsevo. On 25 August, the regiment reached the area of the Servech River. Under threat of encirclement, the 67th Division fought back from Poland to Belarus. In September 1915, the Vilno-Dvinsk offensive took place, which the regiment suffered heavy losses.

== Western Front ==
In March 1916, the regiment took part in the Lake Naroch offensive. The regiment was in the reserves of commander Baluev in the Andreika area, then moved to the area of Lake Slobodskoye. On 24 March 1916, the regiment distinguished itself when capturing the heights south of Lake Naroch, followed by the occupation of enemy trenches in the area of the village of Mokritsa. Despite significant losses, 102 enemy soldiers and an officer were captured. After the offensive, the regiment from the Molodechno region was regrouped on the Tarasevichi - Lake Vishnevskoe line. In beginning of June 1916, the regiment was in the reserves, occupying positions northeast of Baranovichi. On 4 July 1916, the unit was transferred to the group reserve in the Rossoch tract. On the night of 10 and 11 July, having replaced the grenadier division, the unit took positions in front of the Gornoe Skrobovo farm, taking part in the Baranovichi offensive, and suffered significant losses. Heavy fighting in the area of the Skrobov manor's yard continued until the end of the autumn of 1916, with the enemy using flamethrowers. The regiment's personnel exemplified courage and heroism.

In mid-January 1917, the regiment was transferred to the Molodechno region. On 13 February, it received an order to take positions near Lake Vishnevskoye. From the end of May 1917, it was stationed in the town of Izha. In July 1917, the regiment took part in the battles for Smorgon.

== Banner ==
The battle flag was granted on 27 August 1914, a simple banner of the 1900 model. The border is white, the embroidery is gold. Pommel Model 1857 (Army). The shaft is white. Savior Not Made by Hands. Perfect condition. Fate unknown.

== Russian Revolution ==
After the February Revolution, there was unrest in the army. From July to August 1917, a dissolution of discipline occurred in the regiment; soldiers held rallies and refused to follow the orders of their commanders. After the Bolsheviks seized power in November 1917, most of the lower ranks defected to the Bolsheviks.

Three of the former officers of the regiment during the Russian Civil War held highest award of the RSFSR, the Order of the Red Banner: second lieutenant Alexander Gulyakov - twice, staff captain Mikhail Akatov, and captain Grigory Gorchakov.

== Commanders ==
- Colonel Joseph Petrovich Anisimov: (16 August 1914 – 16 December 1914) missing in action (captured)
- Colonel Anatoly Kalinovsky
- Colonel Nikolai Yakovlevich Polunin (1917)
- Colonel Roman Romanovich Cavalier Romanov of Civil Defense (VP dated 13 November 1916)
- Colonel Pavel Vasilievich Chudinov

== St. George Recipients ==
- Staff Captain: Mikhail Pavlovich Akatov: (GO - PAF 04/03/1917).
- Second Lieutenant Vasily Konstantinovich Balev: (GO - VP 01/27/1917, killed 06/25/1916).
- Second Lieutenant Sergei Vasilievich Bukin: (GO - PAF 06/09/1917 killed 03/25/1916).
- Ensign Ivan Ivanovich Gorsky: (GO - PAF dated 04/03/1917, killed 04/01/1916).
- Ensign Sergei Nikolaevich Gusev: (GO - PAF dated 04/03/1917, killed 04/01/1916).
- Staff Captain Semyon Sergeevich Kuzmin: (4th Class VP 11/13/1916).
- Staff Captain Vasily Martinovich Lushkovsky: (4th Class PAF 04/03/1917).
- Ensign Grigory Mikhailovich Orlov: (GO - PAF dated 07/22/1917).
- Colonel Roman Romanovich Romanov: (GO - VP 11/13/1916).
- Ensign Leonty Mikhailovich Rusakov: (4th Class. VP 07.11.1916, died of wounds 09.30.1915).
- Colonel Gavriil Dmitrievich Svistunov
- Lieutenant Vladislav Andreevich Khodyko: (GO - PAF dated 04/03/1917).
- Nikita Davydovich Kholostyakov: (GO - VP 11/13/1916).
- Mikhail Nyaga, priest, holder of the golden pectoral cross on the St. George Ribbon.

== Notable officers ==
- Captain Grigory Gorchakov: Hero of the Russian Civil War, awarded the Order of the Red Banner of the RSFSR.
- Second Lieutenant Alexander Ivanovich Gulyakov: Hero of the Russian Civil War, twice awarded the Order of the Red Banner of the RSFSR.
- Staff Captain Alexander Augustovich Raun
- Lieutenant Alexander Yakovlevich Zakushnyak
- Sergey Sergeevich Yudin, Outstanding doctor.
- Grigory Zakharyevich Frid (1887–1960): regimental photographer, author of a large collection of regimental photos.
