= Dukhovshchinsky =

Dukhovshchinsky (masculine), Dukhovshchinskaya (feminine), or Dukhovshchinskoye (neuter) may refer to:

- Dukhovshchinsky District, a district of Smolensk Oblast, Russia
- Dukhovshchinskoye Urban Settlement, an administrative division and a municipal formation which the town of Dukhovshchina and one rural locality in Dukhovshchinsky District of Smolensk Oblast, Russia are incorporated as
- 267th Dukhovshchinsky Infantry Regiment, namesake of an Imperial Russian Army regiment during World War I
