= Carl Magnus von Hell =

German chemist (1849–1926)

- Born: 8 September 1849; Stuttgart, Germany
- Died: 11 December 1926 (aged 77); Stuttgart, Germany
- Known for: Hell-Volhard-Zelinsky halogenation.
- Scientific career
- Workplaces: Technical University of Stuttgart

Carl Magnus von Hell (8 September 1849, Stuttgart – 11 December 1926, Stuttgart) was the German chemist who discovered, together with Jacob Volhard and the Russian chemist Nikolay Zelinsky, the Hell–Volhard–Zelinsky halogenation reaction.

== Life ==
He studied chemistry at the Technical University of Stuttgart with Hermann von Fehling and at the Ludwig-Maximilians-Universität München with Emil Erlenmeyer. After serving in the Franco-Prussian War in 1870, he became assistant professor, and after the death of Fehling in 1883, professor for chemistry at the Technical University of Stuttgart. He supervised the building of the new laboratory which was finished in 1895/96. His research interests have been dicarboxylic acids, aliphatic hydrocarbons and their synthesis. He synthesized the C_{60}H_{122} showing that carbon chains of up to 60 atoms are possible. Due to an eye illness he asked for retirement in 1914.
