= Anatoly Kalinovsky =

Imperial Russian Army major general (1865–1938)

Anatoly Apollonovich Kalinovsky
- Анатолий Аполлонович Калиновский
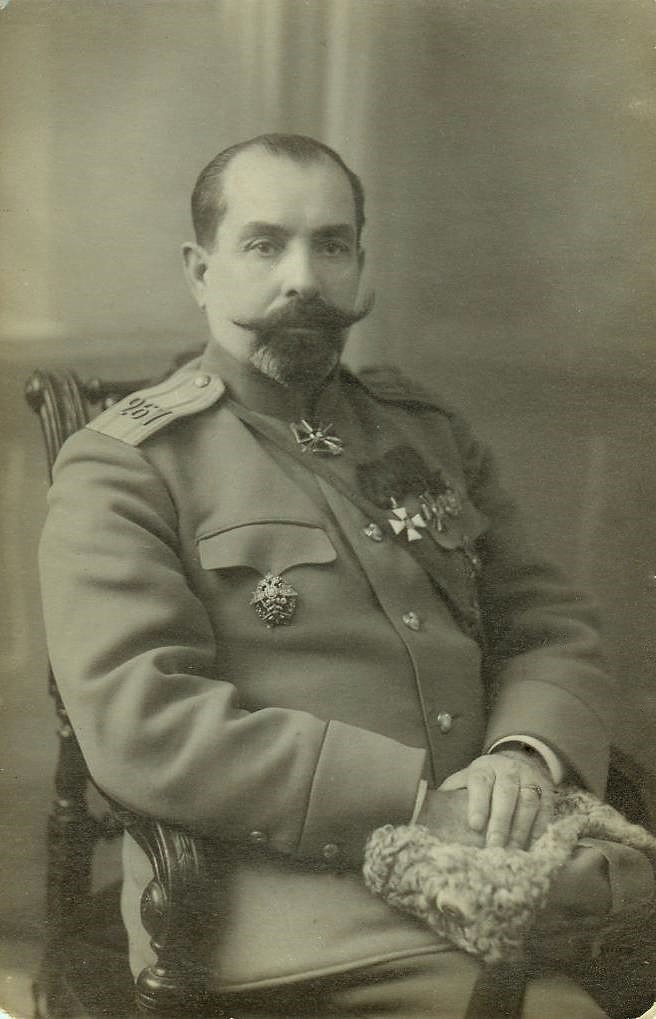
- Born: 25 May [O.S. 6 May] 1865; Russian Empire
- Died: 26 April 1938 (aged 72); Tbilisi, Georgian SSR, Soviet Union
- Military career
- Allegiance: Russian Empire
- Branch: Imperial Russian Army
- Service years: 1881–1917
- Rank: Major general
- Commands: 67th Infantry Division: 267th Dukhovshchinsky Infantry Regiment
- Conflicts: World War I; Vilno-Dvinsk offensive

Anatoly Apollonovich Kalinovsky (Russian: Анато́лий Аполло́нович Калино́вский; 25 May [O.S. 6 May] 1865 – 26 April 1938) was an Imperial Russian Army major general who participated in World War I and was knighted the Order of St. George, 4th Class.

== Biography ==
Kalinovsky came from a noble family and of the Orthodox faith. In 1881, he completed his studies at the Vladikavkaz Military Progymnasium, then entered the Tiflis Infantry Cadet School. After completing his studies, he was promoted as second lieutenant in the 152nd Vladikavkaz Infantry Regiment. Kalinovsky served in various positions and by 1910 was promoted to lieutenant colonel. He was fond of hunting; for some time he was a huntsman for the viceroy of the Caucasus, participated in organizing royal hunts in Transcaucasia, for which he was awarded memorable gifts from Empress Maria Feodorovna. In 1913, he was transferred to the 16th Mingrelian Grenadier Regiment.

== World War I ==
With the rank of colonel (seniority 06.05.1912), Kalinovsky was appointed commander of the 267th Dukhovshchinsky Infantry Regiment which formed from the cadre of the 22nd Infantry Division. He was appointed commander after the previous Anisimov was captured. The regiment's combat operations from the beginning of 1915 took place in the Warsaw Governorate. By the end of the summer of 1915, under the threat of encirclement, the regiment retreated with battles to Belarus. In September 1915, the regiment took part in the Vilno-Dvinsk offensive and suffered heavy losses. In July 1916, the unit took part in the bloody battles near Gornoye and Dolnoye Skrobovo. At the end of 1916, the regiment continued to occupy positions near Skrobovo-Gorodishche. On 12 December 1916, due to illness, Kalinovsky was reassigned to the reserve of ranks at the headquarters of the Minsk Military District, with the appointment of the rank of major general under the St. George Statute. For his distinction in battles, he was awarded many military orders, including the Order of St. George, 4th Class.

== Life under Soviet rule ==
Kalinovsky lived in Tbilisi after the October Revolution continuing to work and look for a worthy occupation under the new regime. From 1924 to 1925, he taught Red Army soldiers the theory of hunting, some of the lectures from this course were published in the monthly periodical magazine "Sport and Hunting" of which he was a regular correspondent during these years. The topics of the articles were "Fauna of Transcaucasia and the Theory of Hunting", training Red Army instructors of Transcaucasia in the theory and practice of shooting at moving targets. The transformed "Hunting Society" currently functions in Tbilisi, its members Kalinovsky their founder. In the 1930s, he was arrested, imprisoned, and had his property confiscated several times. The first two times he was released due to lack of evidence of a crime, the last time he was arrested in 1938, and never returned from prison. In 1939, Kalinovsky's daughter A. A. filed an application with a request to inform Molotov about her father's fate, which was forwarded by his secretariat to the Soviet Union's Prosecutor's Office. The response contained information about the execution of Kalinovsky on 25 April 1938 for anti-Soviet activities under Articles 58.10, 58.11, 58.13 of the Criminal Code of the Georgian SSR, based on the decision of the NKVD troika of the Georgian SSR.

In early 1958, the daughter filed a petition for the rehabilitation of her father, and her father's good name was restored with a great delay on 11 June 1958 by the Supreme Court of the Georgian SSR, and the troika's decision was overturned by this document. According to the oral testimony of Kalinovsky's cellmate, he died in his prison cell the day before the execution from pneumonia. The family is inclined to believe this testimony, that he died in April 1938. During the Soviet era, he created the Military Hunting Society of Transcaucasia, which united people he had known since the time of the tsarist hunts in Transcaucasia, as well as new people who were yet to become hunters.

== Literature ==
- "Русский Инвалид № 146" В-3 с мечами, ВП 26.06.1915 г.
- Библиографический справочник — «Военный орден святого великомученика и победоносца Георгия» РГВИА, 2004.
- Список полковникам по старшинству. Составлен по 01.08.1916. Петроград.
