= Zelinskiy (crater) =

Crater on the Moon

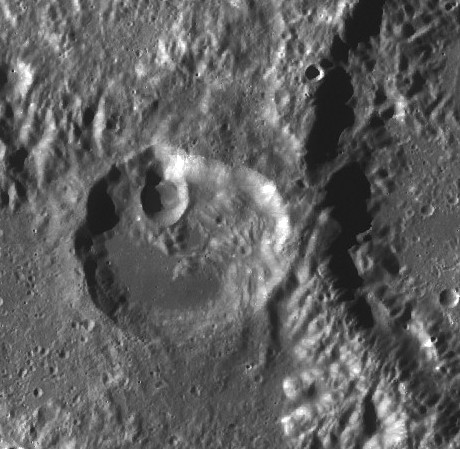
- LRO image
- Coordinates: 28.9°S 166.8°E
- Diameter: 53 km
- Depth: Unknown
- Colongitude: 194° at sunrise
- Eponym: Nikolay D. Zelinskiy

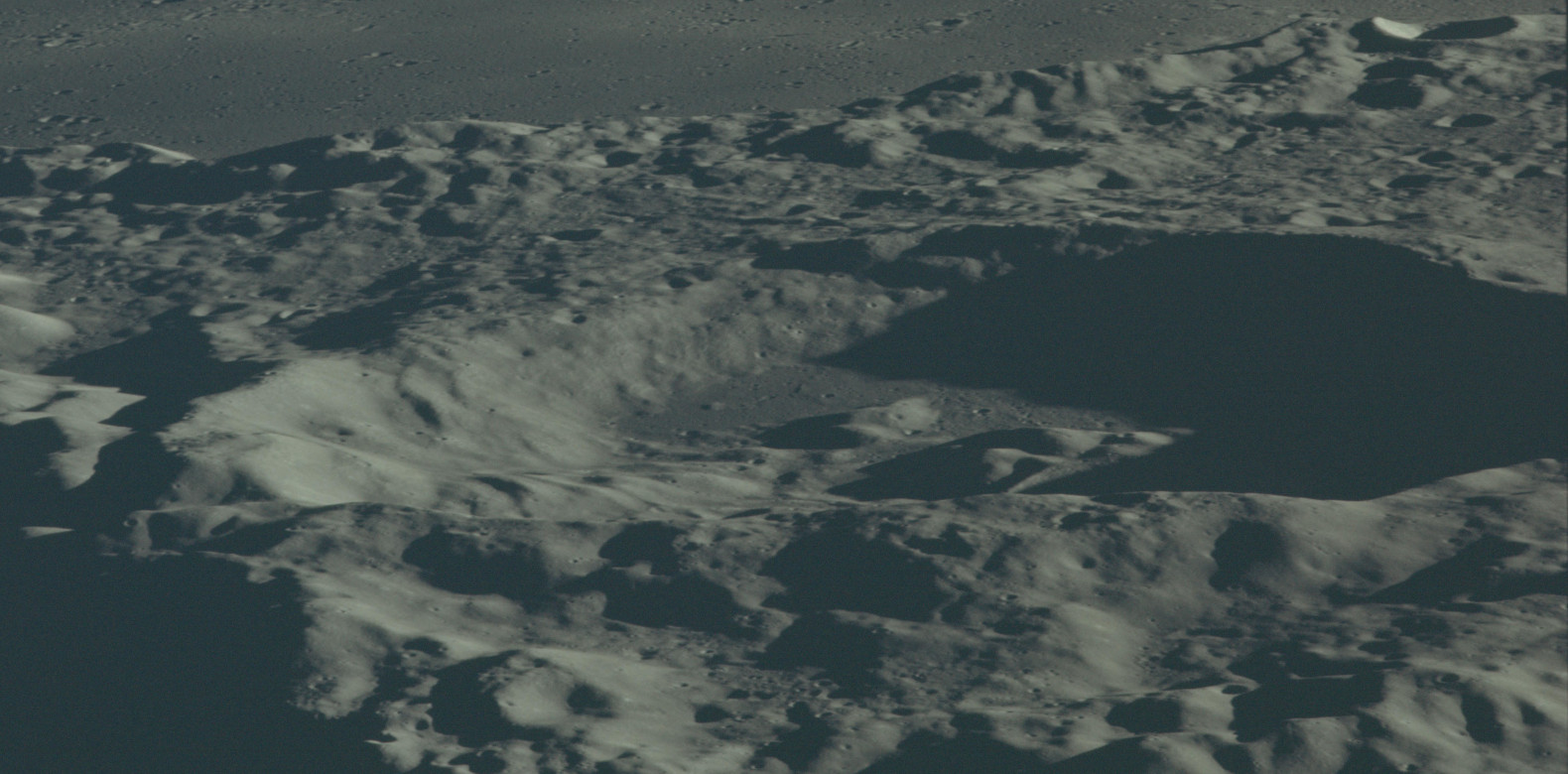
Oblique view from Apollo 17

Zelinskiy is a lunar impact crater that is located on the far side of the Moon. It lies nestled along the northern edge of Mare Ingenii, with the oddly shaped crater Van de Graaff along the east rim and the lava-flooded crater Thomson within one crater diameter to the south.

This crater is somewhat elliptical, having an outwardly bulging rim to the east. Impacts have not significantly eroded many parts of the rim, although a small crater lies along the inner wall at the north end of the interior floor. The floor is relatively level in the south and west, with some irregularities in the surface to the northeast.

== Satellite craters ==
By convention, these features are identified on lunar maps by placing the letter on the side of the crater midpoint closest to Zelinskiy.

Zelinskiy	Latitude	Longitude	Diameter
Y	28.5° S	166.6° E	13 km

Zelinskiy Y lies within Zelinskiy itself, along the northern margin.
