= Hell–Volhard–Zelinsky halogenation =

Chemical reaction

| Named after | Carl Magnus von Hell; Jacob Volhard; Nikolay Zelinsky |
| Reaction type | Substitution reaction |

Identifiers
| Organic Chemistry Portal | hell-volhard-zelinsky-reaction |

The Hell–Volhard–Zelinsky halogenation reaction is a chemical transformation that transforms an alkyl carboxylic acid to the α-bromo derivative. It is a specialized and rare kind of halogenation.

== Examples ==
An example of the Hell–Volhard–Zelinsky reaction can be seen in the preparation of alanine from propionic acid. In the first step, a combination of bromine and phosphorus tribromide (catalyst) is used in the Hell–Volhard–Zelinsky reaction to prepare 2-bromopropionic acid, which in the second step is converted to a racemic mixture of the amino acid product by ammonolysis.

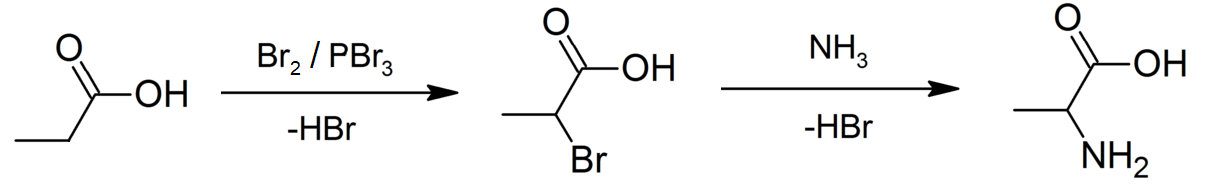

== Mechanism ==
The reaction is initiated by addition of a catalytic amount of PBr_{3}, after which one molar equivalent of Br_{2} is added. PBr_{3} converts the carboxylic OH to the acyl bromide. The acyl bromide tautomerizes to an enol, which reacts with the Br_{2} to brominate at the α position. In neutral to slightly acidic aqueous solution, hydrolysis of the α-bromo acyl bromide occurs spontaneously, yielding the α-bromo carboxylic acid. If an aqueous solution is desirable, a full molar equivalent of PBr_{3} must be used as the catalytic chain is disrupted.

If little nucleophilic solvent is present, reaction of the α-bromo acyl bromide with the carboxylic acid yields the α-bromo carboxylic acid and regenerates the acyl bromide intermediate. In practice a molar equivalent of PBr_{3} is often used anyway to overcome the slow reaction kinetics.

The mechanism for the exchange between an alkanoyl bromide and a carboxylic acid is below. The α-bromoalkanoyl bromide has a strongly electrophilic carbonyl carbon because of the electron-withdrawing effects of the two bromides.

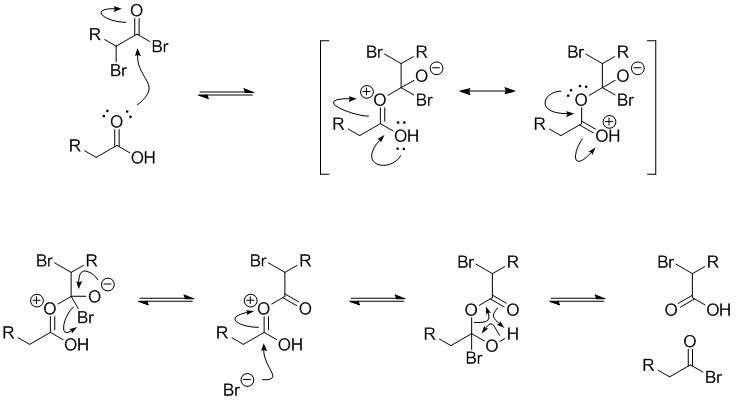

By quenching the reaction with an alcohol, instead of water, the α-bromo ester can be obtained.

== History ==
The reaction is named after the German chemists Carl Magnus von Hell (1849–1926) and Jacob Volhard (1834–1910) and the Russian chemist Nikolay Zelinsky (1861–1953).

== See also ==
- Reformatsky reaction
