= Zelinsky-Kummant gas mask =

World War I protective equipment

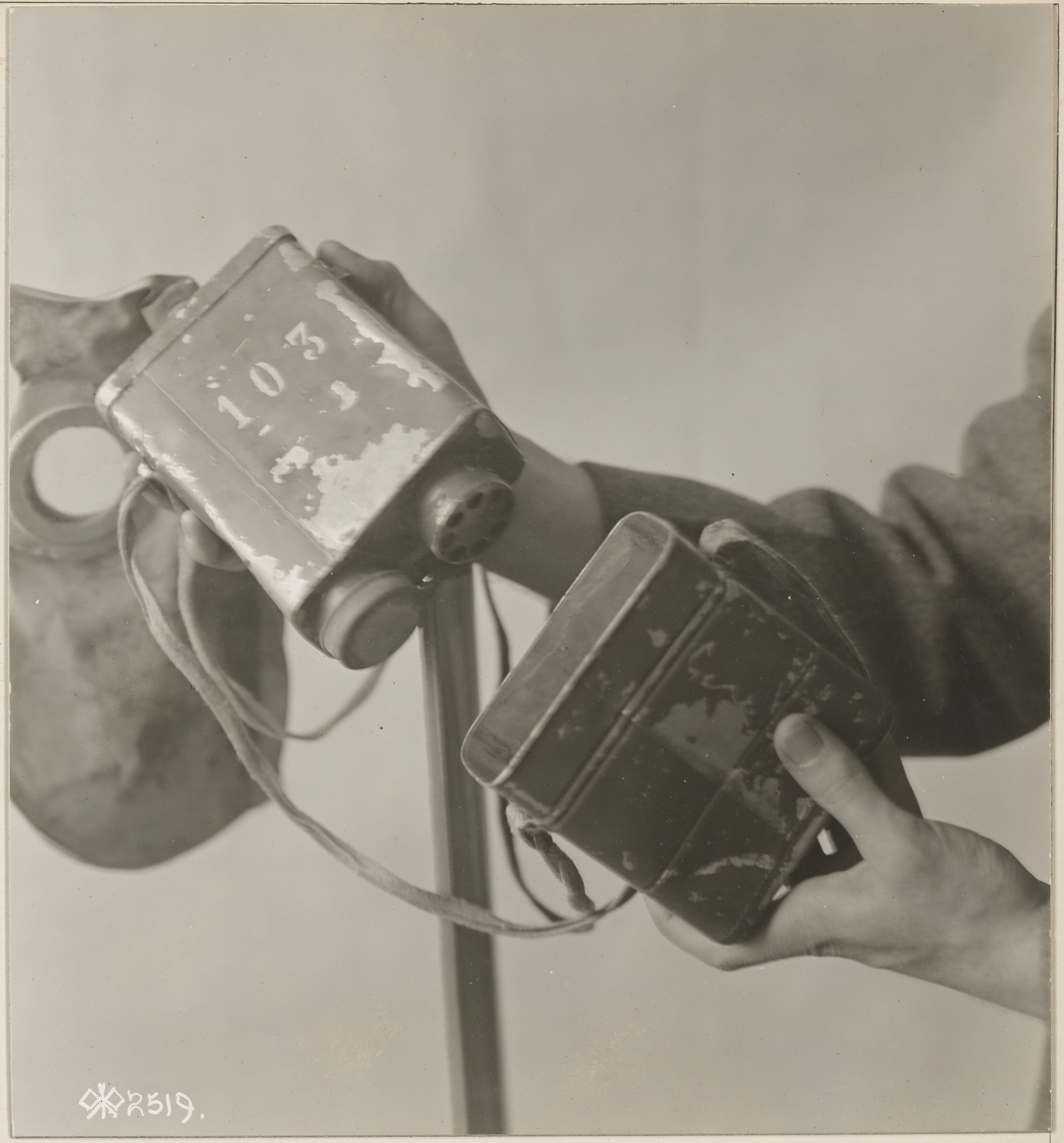
- Type: Gas mask
- Place of origin: Russian Empire

Service history
- In service: 1915–1930s
- Used by: See Users
- Wars: World War I Winter War

Production history
- Designer: Nikolay Zelinsky and M.I. Kummant
- Designed: 1915
- No. produced: 5,030,660

The Zelinsky-Kummant gas mask was, may be, the first Russian gas mask with activated carbon which had the ability to absorb a wide range of chemical warfare agents. This gas mask was developed in 1915 by St. Petersburg chemistry professor Nikolay Zelinsky and technologist of the Triangle plant M.I. Kummant. The design was later improved by I. D. Avalov and entered mass production. After adoption by the Imperial Russian Army during World War I, casualties from chemical attacks decreased sharply.

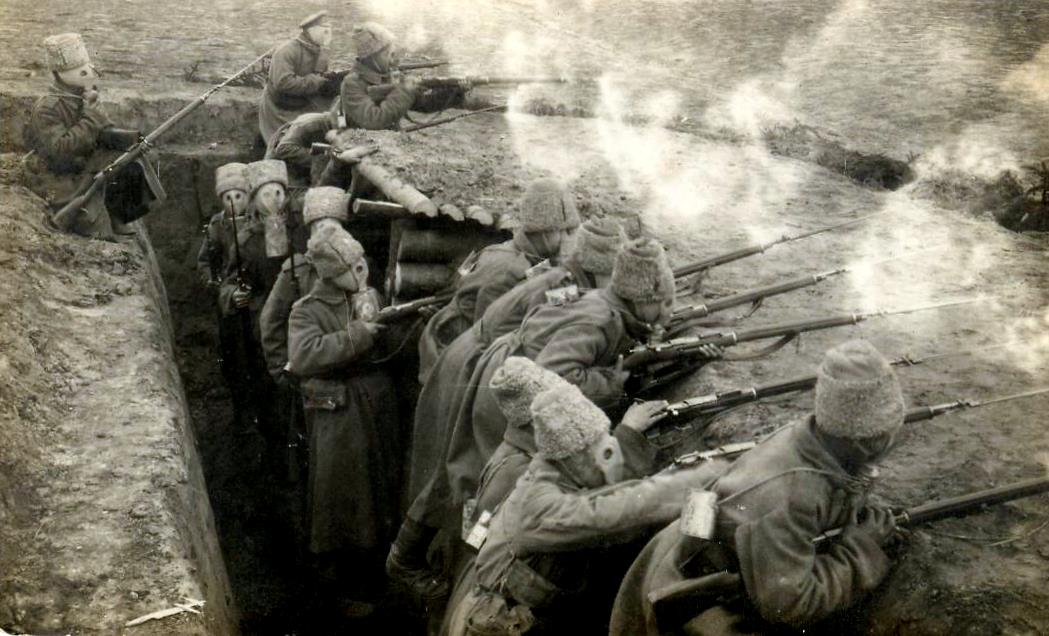
Soldiers of the 267th Dukhovshchinsky Infantry Regiment wearing Zelinsky-Kummant gas masks, 1916

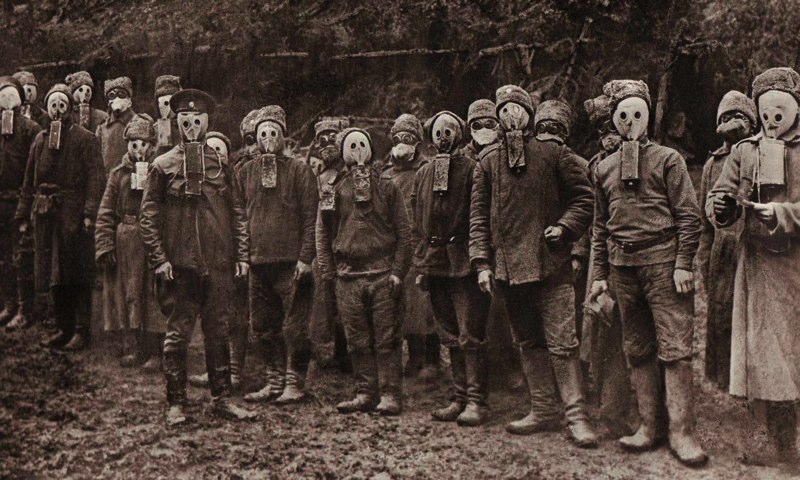
Soldiers of the Czechoslovak Legion in Zelinsky-Kummant gas masks, 1916–1917

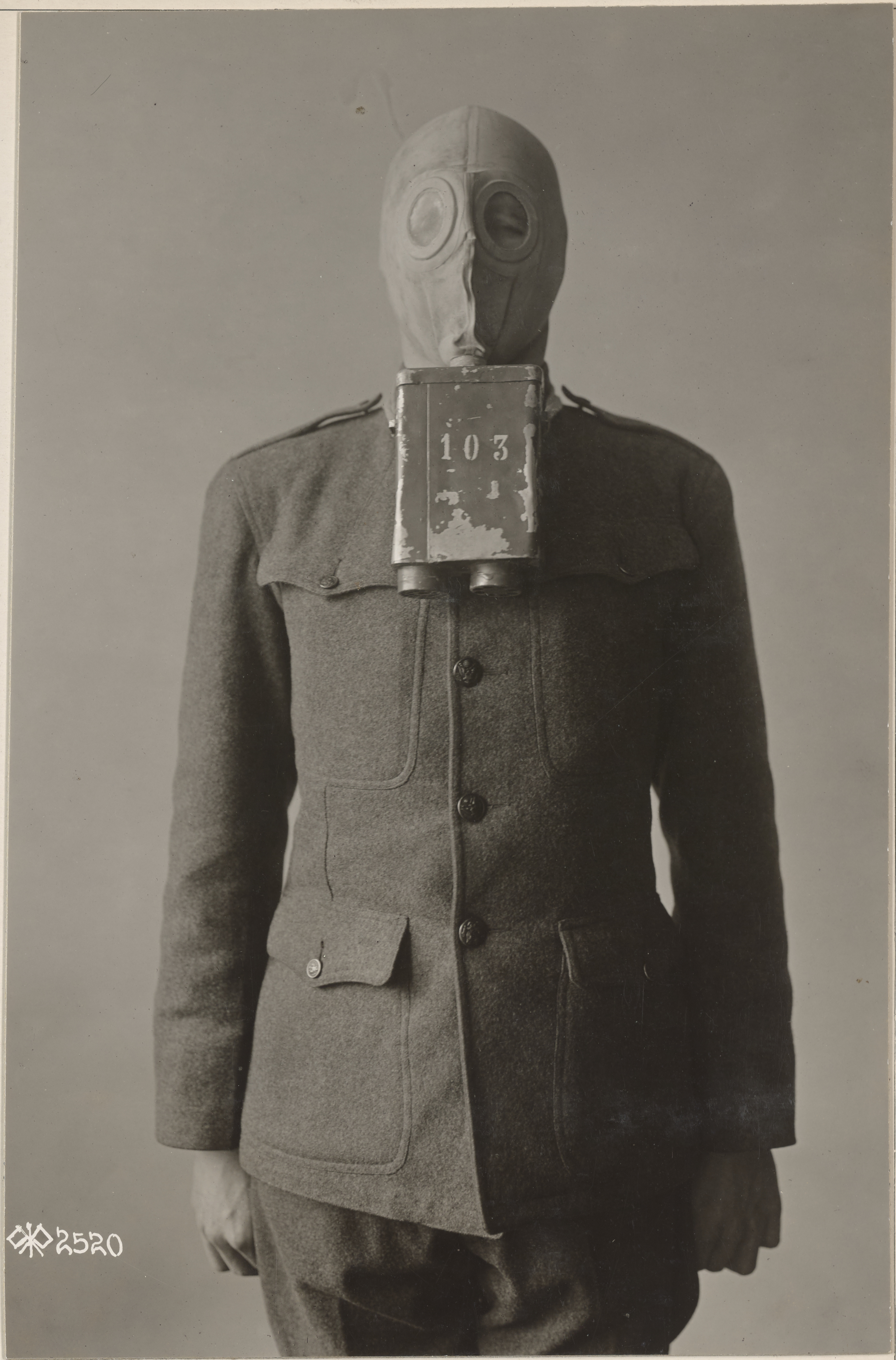
Soldier wearing a gas mask, photo from the U.S. Army War College

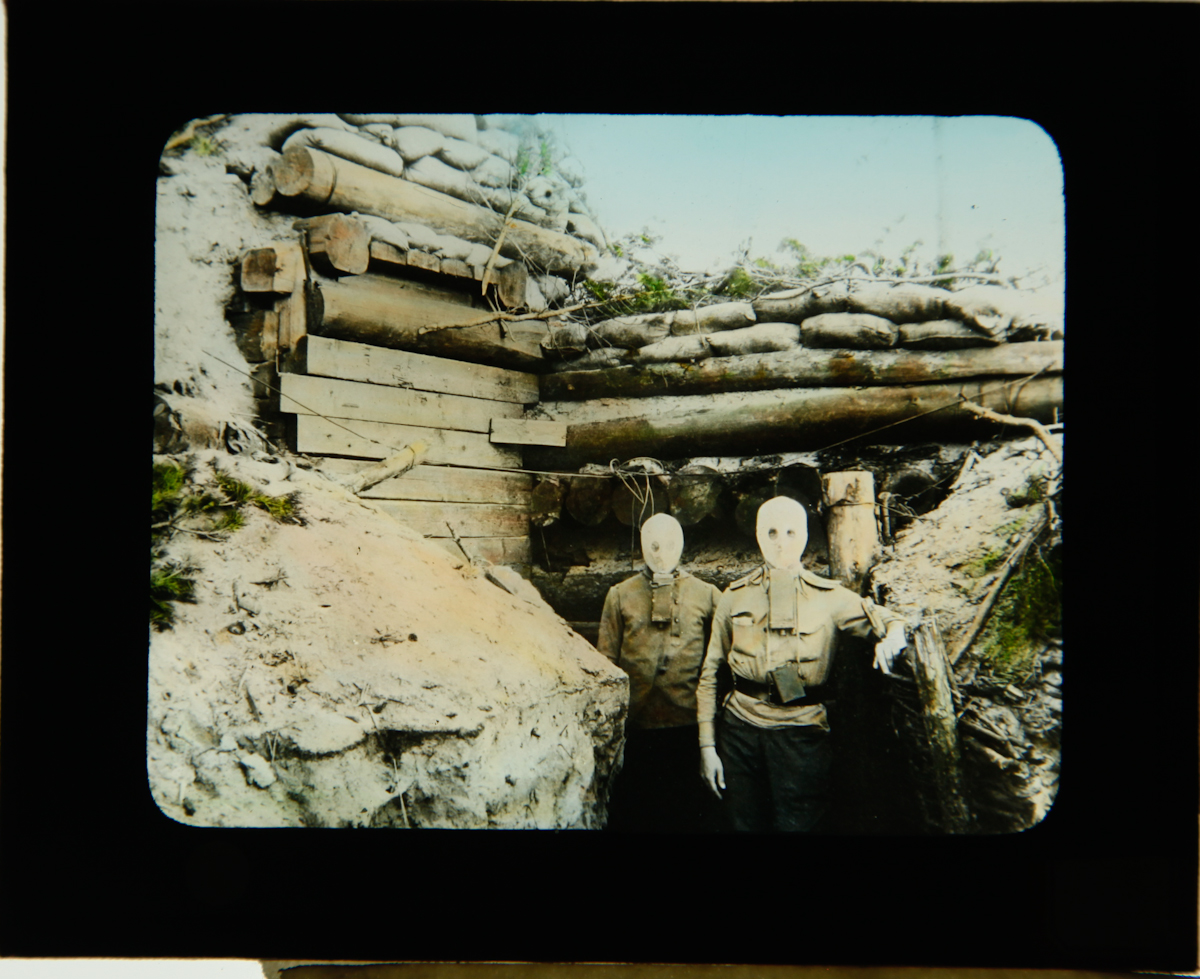
Russian soldiers in Zelinsky-Kummant gas masks, photographed by an American photographer, 1917

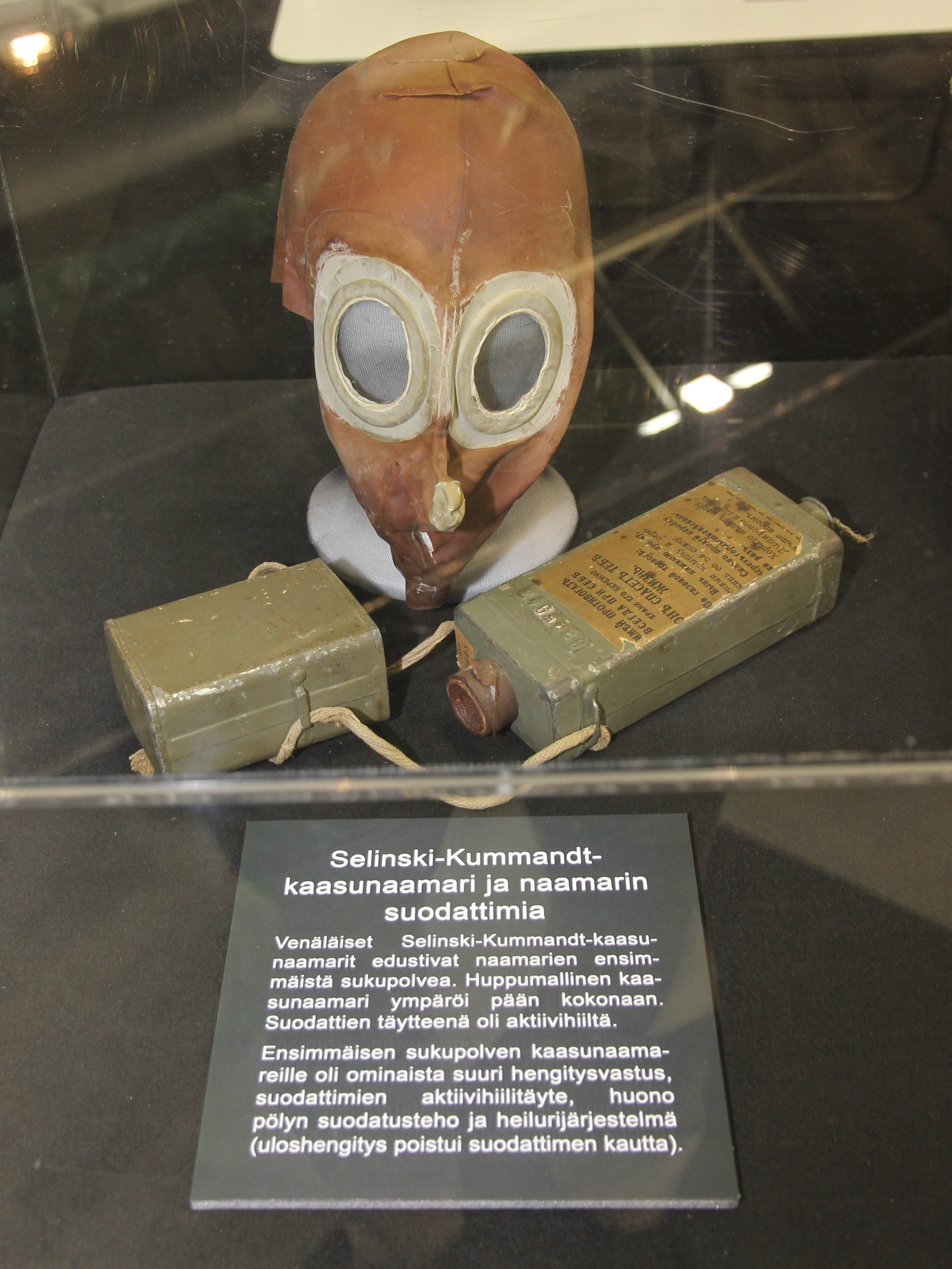
The gas mask preserved in a Finnish museum

== History ==
The world's first negative pressure air-purifying respirator for protection against gases and vapours was probably developed by Scottish scientist John Stenhouse, and the invention was then used in limited quantities in some British factories from the mid-19th century.

Early protection from chemical weapons were "wet masks," which were bandages soaked in a solution of hyposulfite, sodium phenolate, methenamine, etc. They functioned based on the chemical binding of toxic substances and were widely used on the fronts of World War I. However, in addition to the obvious difficulties with use in combat conditions, they only helped against a narrow range of gases (of which several dozen were already in use by 1915). Therefore, chemists searched for nonspecific adsorbents with the greatest absorption capacity. The Germans used diatomaceous earth with pumice, while specialists from the Mining Institute used a mixture of slaked lime and caustic soda lime. After numerous experiments, Nikolay Zelinsky suggested activated birch or linden charcoal.

The total number of gas masks of this model received by the army during World War I was 11,185,750. The use of gas masks and the training of soldiers reduced their losses in gas attacks (1916 - 20%, in 1917 - about 0.5%). By summer of 1916, several hundred thousand soldiers were "fit tested", and in total the army received 5,030,660 gas masks.

Since spring 1917, gas masks were no longer issued to combat units. Troops continued to suffer significant losses from chemical weapons: units on the front line received gas masks without a supply, and fresh reinforcements to the unit were not provided with RPE.

The acute shortage of gas masks meant that, despite its serious shortcomings, this model continued to be used in the Soviet army until the late 1920s.

== Flaws ==
The activated carbon filter perfectly absorbed chlorine at a relatively low concentration. Later, shells and mines were used for chemical attacks; and they were equipped with phosgene, hydrocyanic acid, and other toxic substances. This increased the concentration of toxic substances and changed their chemical composition; and it turned out that in the new conditions, activated carbon alone does not provide the required duration of protection. For example, at a phosgene concentration of 1%, filters began to pass it in less than 6 minutes - while an English filter (with the addition of soda lime with potassium permanganate, in addition to activated carbon) could absorb 5 times more phosgene. Similarly, at a hydrocyanic acid concentration of 0.1%, the service life of Zelinsky filters with activated carbon alone was nine minutes, and with the addition of a chemical absorber took one hour and five minutes. By 1918, English, French, American and German gas mask filters were filled with both activated carbon and chemical absorbers, but in Russia until the very end of the war, they continued to believe in the universality of activated carbon, contrary to the proposals of the Gas Prevention Laboratory of the Chemical Committee at Main Artillery Directorate (ГАУ). In modern industrial gas masks, activated carbon can be saturated with various additives, that is, additives and chemicals are also used.

Substances in the form of aerosols such as fine dust and fog, began to be used for chemical attacks. Small particles passed between large pieces of activated carbon (4–11 mm) unhindered, and there were no aerosol filters in the gas mask boxes.

Another disadvantage of gas masks was difficulty breathing. Some soldiers took off their gas masks, and were poisoned. Some soldiers "fell out of action due to shortness of breath, palpitations, dizziness" to the point of loss of consciousness. This was initially attributed to increased respiratory resistance. Accordingly, they began to change the design of the filter. But even when the amount of absorber was reduced to such a small value that the service life turned out to be unacceptably short, the problem could not be solved. Then measurements showed that exhaled air, with an increased concentration of carbon dioxide and a reduced concentration of oxygen (up to 13%), accumulates in the mask and filter - and is then inhaled again. As a result, its concentration in the inhaled air could reach 5.5% (for comparison, the maximum permissible concentration of CO_{2}: average over 8 hours (TWA) - 0.5% (average shift 8 hours); average over 15 minutes (STEL) - 1.4%; t .e. 9 and 27 grams per 1 cubic meter, respectively). After modifications, the gas mask was equipped with exhalation and inhalation valves, and the concentration of carbon dioxide decreased (to approximately 1.3-3.6%, depending on the gas mask model and type of activity). Even after the alterations, the concentration of oxygen in the inhaled air was reduced, and carbon dioxide was increased.

Tests proved it was not always possible to achieve a hermetically sealed connection between the glass and the mask.

== Users ==
- Finland: Inherited stocks from the Imperial Russian Army. Used during the Winter War.
- Kingdom of Romania: Received masks as wartime ally.
- Latvia
- Russian Empire: Primary user.
- RSFSR: Inherited stocks from the Imperial Russian Army following World War I.

== Literature ==
- Описание противогазных повязок и масок, имеющихся в действующих армиях. Смоленск, 1915.
- Кориц И. Г. Удушливые и ядовитые газы Издание Штаба Московского военного округа. Москва, 1916.
- (Ядовитые газы. Казань, 1917.)
- Зелинский А. Н. Спаси и сохрани: К 100-летию «Противогаза Зелинского» // «Русский вестник». — 03.07.2015.
- Супотницкий М. В., Петров С. В., Ковтун В. А., Борисов Ю. И. О приоритете российских ученых в создании современного фильтрующего противогаза: К 100-летию противогаза Зелинского—Кумманта // Российский химический журнал. — 2016. — No. 2. — С. 95–112.
- Супотницкий М. В. [cont.ws/@lexa2/543706 От «шлема Гипо» — к защите Зелинского: Как совершенствовались противогазы в годы Первой мировой войны] // Офицеры. — 2011. — No. 1 (51). — С. 50–55.
- Бакин А. Н., Рогожкин Ю. А., Горошинкин М. В. «С моим противогазом не бойтесь! Он спасет вас от любых газов». К 100-летию создания первого русского противогаза. // Военно-исторический журнал. — 2015. — No. 12. — С.41-45.
