= Nikolai Shilov =

Nikolai Alexandrovich Shilov (10 July 1872 – 17 August 1930) was a Russian and Soviet chemist who studied reactions, catalysis, and induction.

Shilov was born in Moscow and graduated in 1895, after which he worked on chemical kinetics in Wilhelm Ostwald's Leipzig laboratory. In 1910, he became a professor of inorganic chemistry at the Moscow Technical College. During World War I, he studied gas warfare and, with N. D. Zelinsky, developed charcoal adsorption masks to protect members of the Russian army. He studied oxidation reactions and introduced several terms, including inductor, acceptor, and induction factor. In 1919, he examined the dissolution proportions of a substance in a mixture of two solvents. He also developed an explanation for surface adsorption and the principle of ion-exchange filters.
