= Nikolay Zelinsky =

Russian chemist (1861–1953)

- Николай Зелинский
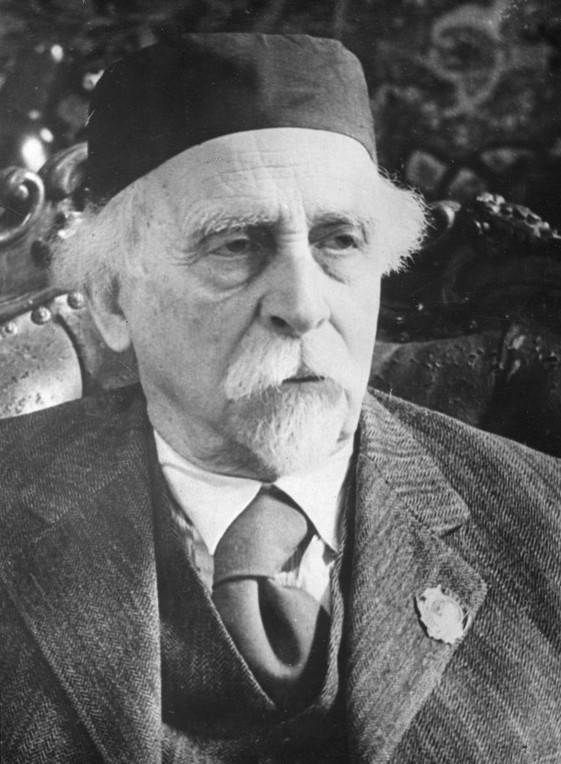
- Zelinsky in 1941
- Born: Nikolay Dmitriyevich Zelinsky; 6 February 1861; Tiraspol, Kherson Governorate, Russian Empire
- Died: 31 July 1953 (aged 92); Moscow, Soviet Union
- Known for: Zelinsky–Kummant gas mask Hell–Volhard–Zelinsky halogenation

Nikolay Dmitriyevich Zelinsky (Russian: Николай Дмитриевич Зелинский; Ukrainian: Микола Дмитрович Зелінський, romanized: Mykola Dmytrovich Zelinskyy; 6 February [O.S. 25 January] 1861 – 31 July 1953) was a Russian and Soviet chemist and educator. He was a professor at Moscow University from 1893 and an academician of the Academy of Sciences of the Soviet Union (1929).

Zelinsky studied at the University of Odessa and at the universities of Leipzig and Göttingen in Germany. Zelinsky was one of the founders of theory on organic catalysis. He was the inventor of the first effective filtering activated charcoal gas mask in the world (1915).

== Life ==
Nikolai Zelinsky was born on 6 February [O.S. 25 January] 1861 in Tiraspol in a noble family. His father Dmitry Osipovich Zelinsky, who came from hereditary Volhynian nobles, died of rapidly developing consumption in 1863; two years later his mother died of the same disease. The orphaned boy was left in the care of his grandmother M.P. Vasilyeva and he spent his childhood in her village.

At the age of ten, Nikolai Zelinsky entered the Tiraspol district school for two-year courses to prepare for entering the gymnasium. Having completed them ahead of schedule at the age of 11, he entered the second grade of Odessa Richelieu Gymnasium.

After graduating from the gymnasium in 1880, Zelinsky entered the natural science department of the Physics and Mathematics Faculty of the Novorossiysk University, and graduated in 1884. He was given an appointment at the university and was sent to Germany. He did research for two years (1885–1887), first he worked in the laboratory of Johannes Wislicenus in Leipzig. Then he performed a study of a new reaction in the laboratory of Viktor Meyer in Göttingen, which led to severe poisoning himself with mustard gas, which had not been studied enough by that time. In 1887 he was appointed Privatdozent in the Department of Chemistry at the Novorossiysk University. In 1888, he passed the master's exam, and in 1889, he defended his master's thesis ("On the issue of Isomer in the thiophene series"), and in 1891, he defended his doctoral thesis ("Investigation of the phenomena of isomerism in the series of saturated carbon compounds").

He was invited to Moscow University on the initiative of Dmitri Mendeleev. He was a professor at Moscow University from 1893 until his death, with the exception of the period 1911–1917. From 1893, he became an extraordinary professor at the Department of Organic Chemistry, and from 1902, he was an ordinary professor.

In 1911, he left the university with a group of scientists in protest against the policy of the tsarist Minister of Education Lev Kasso. From 1911 to 1917, he worked as a professor at the St. Petersburg Polytechnic Institute.

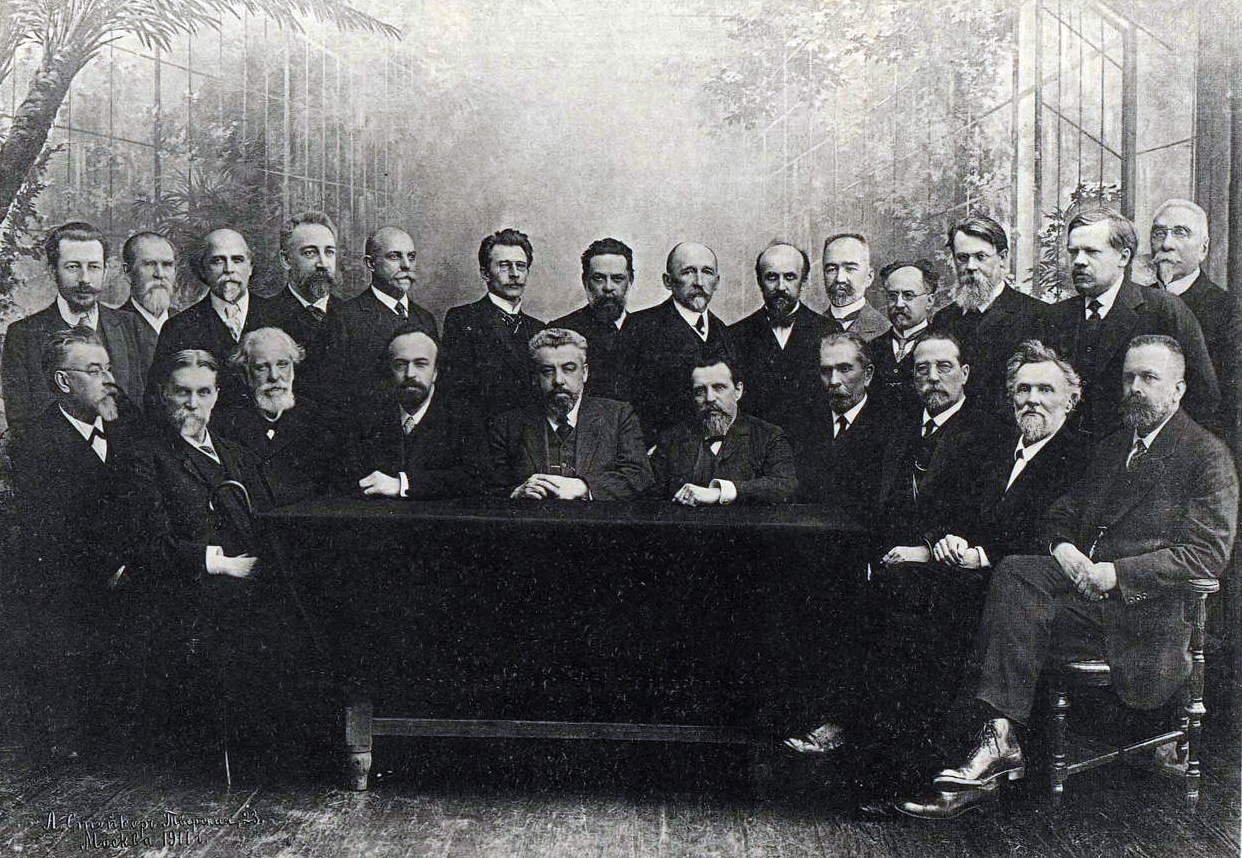
Professors who left Moscow University in 1911. Seated: V. P. Serbsky, K. A. Timiryazev, N. A. Umov, P. A. Minakov, M. A. Menzbir, A. B. Fokht, V. D. Shervinsky, V. K. Tserasky, E. N. Trubetskoy. Standing: I. P. Aleksinsky, V. K. Rot, N. D. Zelinsky, P. N. Lebedev, A. A. Eikhenvald, G. F. Shershenevich, V. M. Khvostov, A. S. Alekseev, F. A. Rein, D. M. Petrushevsky, B. K. Mlodzeevsky, V. I. Vernadsky, S. A. Chaplygin, N. V. Davydov.

In 1917, he returned to Moscow University. There, he was a professor of the Department of Chemistry (1917–1929) of the Physics and Mathematics Faculty, then he became the head of the Department of Organic Chemistry (1929–1930 and 1933–1938), head of the Department of Petroleum Chemistry (1938–1953), and head of the Laboratory of Antibiotics and Biogenic Bases (1950–1953) of the Faculty of Chemistry. Also, he was the head of the Department of Organic Chemistry of the Chemical Department (1932–1933).

From 1935, he actively participated in the organization of the Institute of Organic Chemistry of the USSR Academy of Sciences, later he headed a number of its laboratories.

On 10 July, 1941 Zelinsky joined the Scientific and Technical Council for the development and testing of scientific works related to military defense, chaired by the authorized State Defense Committee, Professor Sergei Kaftanov. During the Great Patriotic War, he worked in evacuation until the summer of 1943. Zelinsky took part in work to improve the quality of aviation gasolines and lubricating oils. A new process has been developed to produce high octane fuel; new catalysts were found for the processes of aromatization of oil and the production of defense products. Under the leadership of Zelinsky, the process of catalytic cracking of oil was studied in detail with the determination of the chemical nature of its products by spectral methods. Zelinsky also supervised work on finding ways to rationally use the products of primary processing of solid fuels - coal, shale and peat. In this regard, the problem of separation of sulfur from shale resins has become important. Shale accounted for about three-quarters of the fuel reserves of the USSR, but their high sulfur content depreciated them as a raw material for motor fuel. During the war years Zelinsky found a solution to this problem by passing shale oils mixed with hydrogen over platinum or nickel on aluminum oxide at 300 °. Sulfur was removed as hydrogen sulfide. The development of petrochemistry in the USSR has led to a radical reconstruction of the oil refining industry for the production of artificial liquid fuel. As a result of scientific research, it has become possible to use not only liquid, but also solid fossil fuels as a valuable raw material for high-octane motor fuel and high-quality lubricant oils. Thus, the necessary prerequisites were created for processing the richest coal resources of Western Siberia, coal and natural gas from Ukhta and Pechora and other areas remote from the front into motor fuel.

Nikolai Zelinsky died on July 31, 1953. He was buried in Moscow at the Novodevichy Cemetery (Division 1), and a headstone was made by Nilolai Nikoghosyan.

== Scientific activity ==
Zelinsky's scientific activity was very versatile: his works on the chemistry of thiophene and the stereochemistry of organic dibasic acids are widely known. In the summer of 1891, Zelinsky participated in an expedition to survey the waters of the Black Sea and the Odessa estuaries on the gunboat Zaporozhets, where he proved for the first time that the hydrogen sulfide contained in the water was of bacterial origin. During the period of life and work in Odessa, Nikolai Zelinsky wrote 40 scientific papers.

A number of his works were also devoted to electrical conductivity in non-aqueous solutions and to the chemistry of amino acids, but his main works were related to the chemistry of hydrocarbons and organic catalysis.

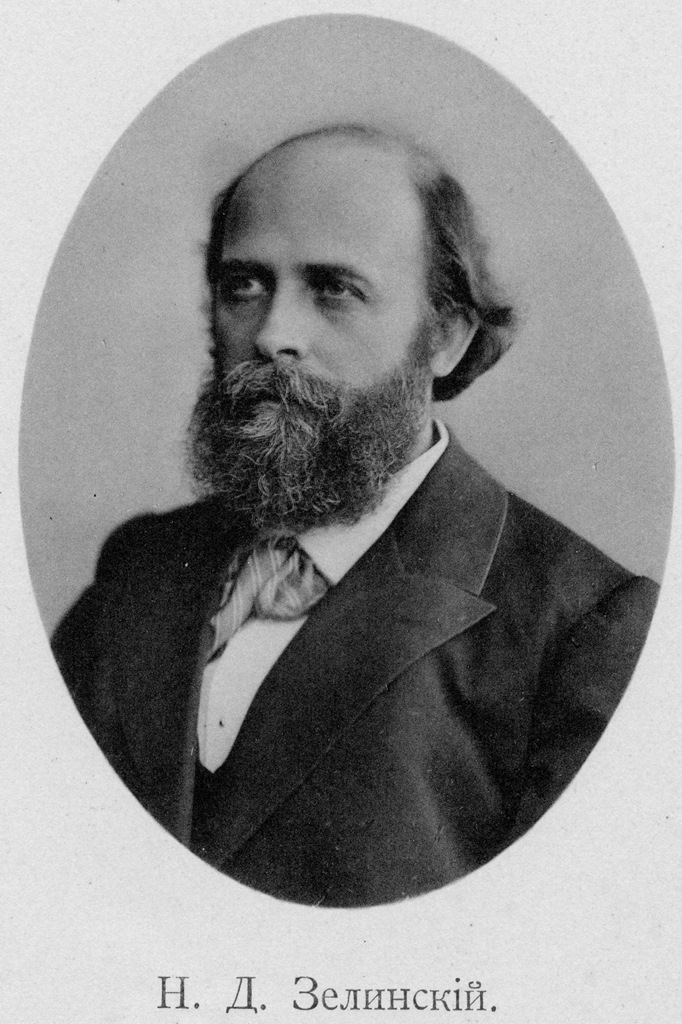
Nikolai Zelinsky

In 1895–1907 he was the first to synthesize a number of cyclopentane and cyclohexane hydrocarbons, which served as standards for studying the chemical composition and the basis for artificial modeling of oil and oil fractions.

In 1910 he discovered the phenomenon of dehydrogenation catalysis, which consists in the exclusively selective action of platinum and palladium on cyclohexane and aromatic hydrocarbons and in the ideal reversibility of hydro- and dehydrogenation reactions only depending on temperature. In 1911 he carried out a smooth dehydrogenation of cyclohexane and its homologues into aromatic hydrocarbons in the presence of platinum and palladium catalysts; he widely used this reaction to determine the content of cyclohexane hydrocarbons in gasoline and kerosene fractions of oil (1920–1930), and also as an industrial method for obtaining aromatic hydrocarbons from oil. These Zelinsky’s studies underlie the modern processes of catalytic reforming of petroleum fractions.

Subsequent research led Zelinsky and his students to the discovery of the reaction of hydrogenolysis of cyclopentane hydrocarbons with their transformation into alkanes in the presence of platinized coal and excess hydrogen in 1934.

In 1915, Zelinsky successfully used oxide catalysts for oil cracking, which led to a decrease in the process temperature and an increase in the yield of aromatic hydrocarbons. In 1918–1919, he developed a method for producing gasoline by solar oil and petroleum cracking in the presence of aluminum chloride and aluminum bromide; the implementation of this method on an industrial scale played an important role in providing gasoline to the Soviet state. Zelinsky improved the reaction of catalytic conversion of acetylene into benzene by suggesting the use of activated carbon as a catalyst. Zelinsky and his students also studied the dehydrogenation of paraffins and olefins in the presence of oxide catalysts.

Being a supporter of the theory of the organic origin of oil, Zelinsky conducted a series of studies to connect its genesis with sapropels, oil shale and other natural and synthetic organic substances.

Zelinsky and his students proved the intermediate formation of methylene radicals in many heterogeneous catalytic reactions: in the decomposition of cyclohexane, in the synthesis of hydrocarbons from carbon monoxide and hydrogen on a cobalt catalyst, in the reactions of hydrocondensation of olefins with carbon monoxide and hydropolymerization of olefins in the presence of small amounts of oxide carbon which were discovered by him.

The works of Zelinsky and his scientific team on the adsorption of gases on activated carbons were important for the country's defense ability, the creation of a coal gas mask in cooperation with Kumant (1915) and its adoption during the First World War in the Russian and allied armies were significant for the country's defense ability.

== Pedagogical activity ==
Zelinsky created a large scientific school and its scientists made fundamental contributions to various fields of chemistry. Among his students werw Academicians of the Academy of Sciences of the USSR A. A. Balandin, L. F. Vereshchagin, B. A. Kazansky, K. A. Kocheshkov, S. S. Nametkin, A. N. Nesmeyanov; Corresponding Members of the Academy of Sciences of the USSR N. A. Izgaryshev, K. P. Lavrovsky, Yu. G. Mamedaliev, B. M. Mikhailov, A. V. Rakovsky, V. V. Chelintsev, N. I. Shuikin; professors V. V. Longinov, A. E. Uspensky, L. A. Chugaev, N. A. Shilov, V. A. Nekrasova-Popova and others.

N. D. Zelinsky - one of the organizers of the All-Union Chemical Society named after D. I. Mendeleev; since 1941 he was its honorary member. Since 1921 - an honorary member of the Moscow Society of Naturalists, since 1935 he was its president.

== Personal life ==
- the first wife – Raisa (died in 1906) – their marriage lasted 25 years.
- the second wife – Evgenia Kuzmina-Karavaeva, pianist – their marriage lasted 25 years.
  - daughter Raisa Zelinskaya-Plate (1910-2001).
- the third wife - Nina Evgenievna Zhukovskaya-Bok, an artist – their marriage lasted 20 years.
  - son Andrei (1933).
  - son Nikolai (1940)

== Awards ==
- corresponding academician of the Spanish Royal Academy of Sciences (1934)
- Hero of Socialist Labor (06/10/1945)
- four Orders of Lenin (05/07/1940; 06/10/1945; 02/05/1946; 02/05/1951)
- two PrOrders of the Red Banner of Labor (03/29/1941; 04/03/1944)
- USSR State Prize from the seizure of the chemicalization of the national economy of the USSR (1934)
- USSR State Prize of the first degree (1942) - for outstanding scientific works on organic chemistry, published in the collection of selected works of the author in 1941
- USSR State Prize of the second degree (1946) - for the development of a new method for obtaining aromatic hydrocarbons
- USSR State Prize of the first degree (1948)
- A. M. Butlerov Prize of the Russian Physical and Chemical Society (1924)

== Recognition ==
- The Zelinsky Institute of Organic Chemistry of Russian Academy of Sciences is named after him since 1953;
- In 1961, a postage stamp was issued in honor of N. D. Zelinsky in the USSR;
- One of the Moscow streets is named after him, as well as streets in the cities of Voskresensk (Moscow region), Tiraspol, Chișinău, Tyumen, Yaroslavl, Veliky Novgorod, Orsk, Karaganda, Daugavpils, Alma-Ata and Mariupol;
- On the occasion of the 150th anniversary of the birth of the scientist, the State Unitary Enterprise “Marka Pridnestrovya” issued a series of stamps and envelopes;
- The large chemical auditorium of the Faculty of Chemistry of Moscow State University is named after Zelinsky;
- The crater Zelinskiy on the Moon is named in his honor (since 1970);
- On June 2, 2014, the name of Nikolai Dmitrievich Zelinsky was given to an enterprise producing personal and collective protective equipment - JSC Elektrostal Chemical and Mechanical Plant;
- May 19, 2016 in St. Petersburg on the building of the Research Institute of Metrology. D. I. Mendeleev (Moskovsky Prospekt, 19) a commemorative plaque was installed (sculptor-artist V. A. Sivakov) with the text: “Here, in 1915, the outstanding scientist Nikolai Dmitrievich Zelinsky invented a coal gas mask”

=== Monuments ===
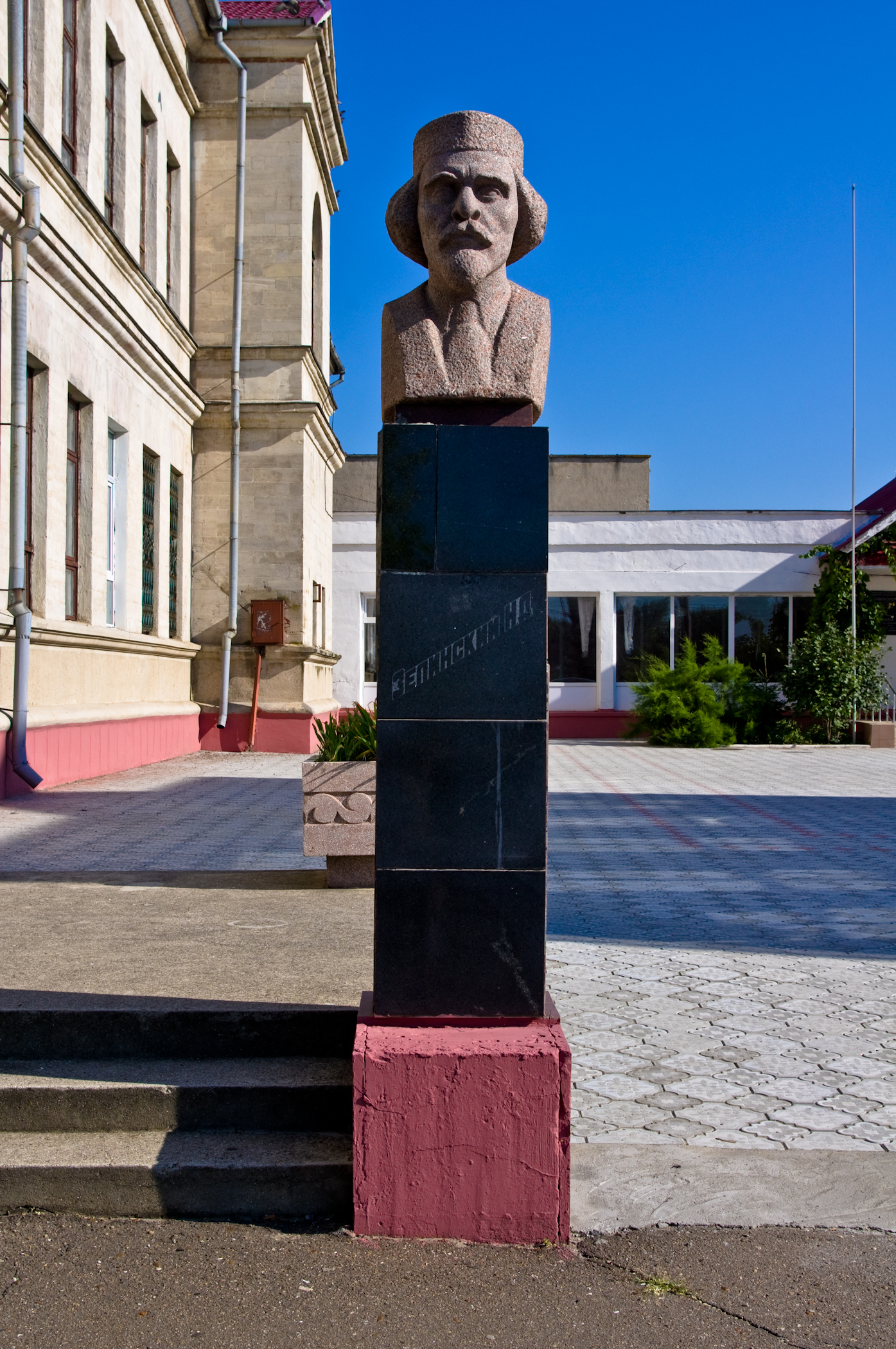
Monument in Tiraspol (Moldova)

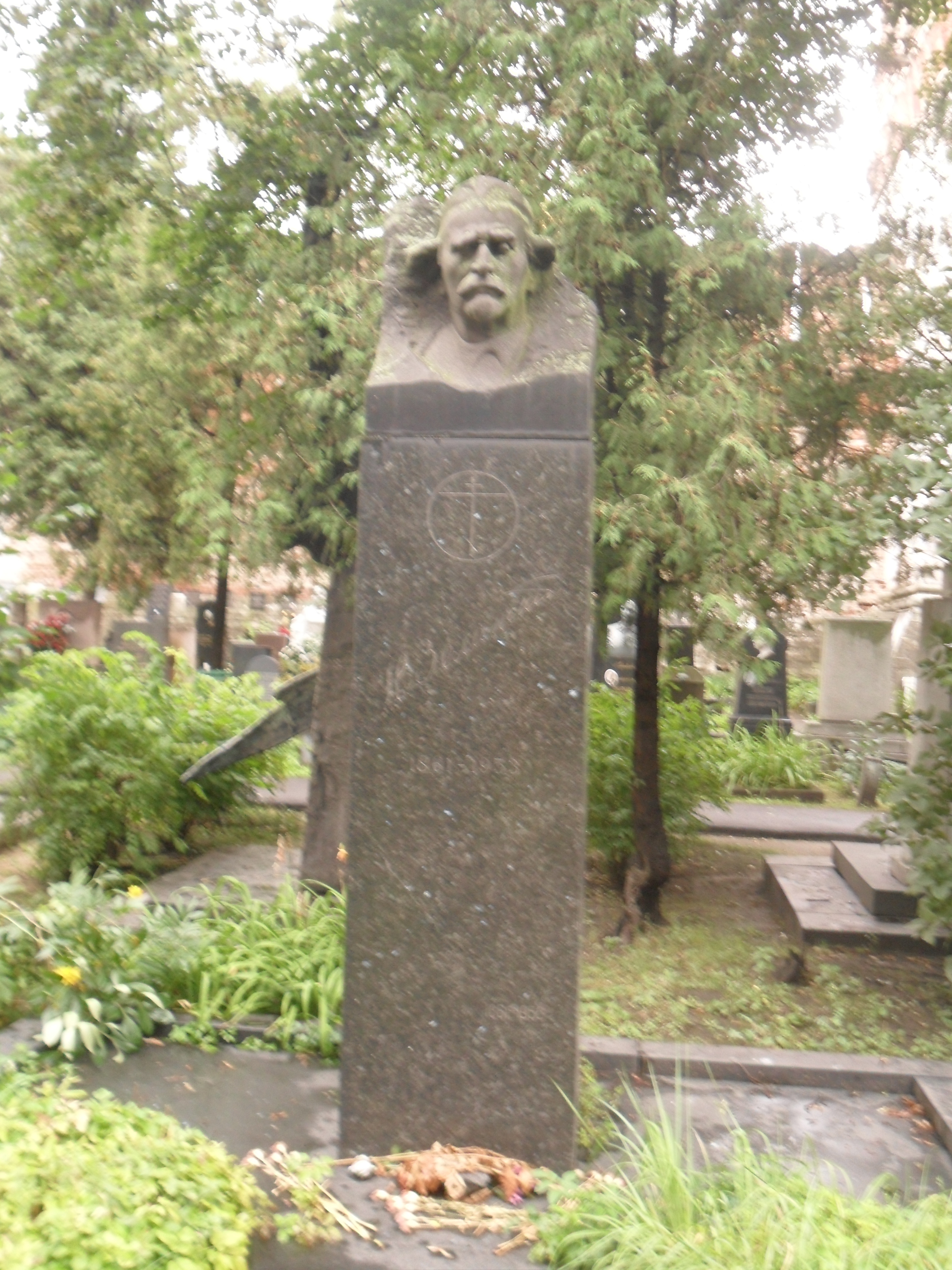
Grave of chemist Nikolai Zelinsky

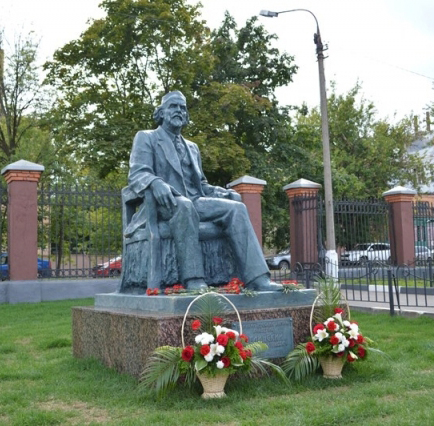
Monument to Zelinsky in Elektrostal

There is a monument of Zelinsky in Elektrostal city. It was opened in July 2013 in front of the entrance of the Elektrostal Chemical and Mechanical Plant OJSC.

=== In Transnistria ===
In Tiraspol, in the house in which Zelinsky spent his childhood, there is a memorial house-museum of the academician, and on the building of school No. 6 (now the humanitarian and mathematical gymnasium), where he studied, a memorial plaque was erected, a monument was erected in front of the building; in the Kirovsky district of Tiraspol there is a street named after Zelinsky. In Chișinău, a street in the Botanica sector is named after him.

=== In Ukraine ===
In Odessa, in the house in which Zelinsky lived while working at Novorossiysk University, the Department of Organic Chemistry, a descendant of the Odessa National University named after I.I.Mechnikov, now houses a memorial plaque.

== Compositions ==
- Investigation of the phenomena of stereoisomerism in the series of saturated carbonaceous compounds. - Odessa: type. A. Schulze, 1891. - 190 p.
- Materials for the study of the genesis of silt deposits [Rev. ed. acad. N. D. Zelinsky]. - M.-L .: Publishing House of Acad. Sciences of the USSR, 1939. - 200 p.
- Coal as a means of combating asphyxiating and poisonous gases: An experimental study of 1915-1916. / N. D. Zelinsky and V. S. Sadikov. - M.-L .: Publishing House of Acad. Sciences of the USSR, 1941. - 131 p.
- Selected Works, vols. 1-2, M.-L., 1941;
- The great Russian chemist A. M. Butlerov (1828-1886) / Acad. N. D. Zelinsky; with the participation of M. M. Azarin. - M .: Publishing House of Moscow. islands of naturalists, 1949. - 241 p.
- Higher fatty acids and their relationship to tubercle bacilli / Acad. N. D. Zelinsky and Assoc. L. S. Bondar. - M .: Publishing House of Moscow. islands of naturalists, 1951. - 84 p.

Collection of works, vol. 1-4, M., 1954-1960

== Literature ==
- Academician Nikolai Dmitrievich Zelinsky: Ninetieth birthday. Sat. - M., 1952.
- Volkov V.A., Kulikova M.V. (2003). Ilizarov, S. S. (ed.). Московские профессора XVIII — начала XX веков. Естественные и технические науки. Деятели науки и просвещения Москвы. Moscow: Janus-K. pp. 92—93. ISBN 5-8037-0164-5.
- Zelinsky A.N. Спаси и сохрани: К 100-летию «Противогаза Зелинского» // Russian Bulletin - 07/03/2015.
- Zelinsky Nikolai Dmitrievich // Great Soviet Encyclopedia: [in 30 volumes] / ch. ed. A. M. Prokhorov. - 3rd ed. - M .: Soviet Encyclopedia, 1969-1978.
- Kazansky B. A., Nesmeyanov A. N., Plate A. F. Работы академика Н. Д. Зелинского и его школы в области химии углеводородов и органического катализа. / Ученые записки МГУ. Issue. 175. - M., 1956.
- Moscow University in the Great Patriotic War. - 4th, revised and supplemented. Moscow: Moscow University Press, 2020 - 1000 copies. - ISBN 978-5-19-011499-7.
- Nametkin S. S. President of the Moscow Society of Naturalists, Academician Nikolai Dmitrievich Zelinsky: On the occasion of his 80th birthday. - B. m., 1941.
- Nikolai Dmitrievich Zelinsky / USSR Academy of Sciences. — M.; L .: Publishing house of the Academy of Sciences of the USSR, 1946. - 88 p. - (Materials for the bio-bibliography of scientists of the USSR. Series of chemical sciences. Issue 1).
- Nilov E. I. (1964). Pisarzhevsky, O. (ed.). Зелинский. Жизнь замечательных людей. Moscow: Молодая гвардия.
- Plate A.F. Nikolai Dmitrievich Zelinsky // People of Russian science: Mathematics - Mechanics - Astronomy - Physics - Chemistry. - M., 1961.
- Sysoeva E. K., Terentiev P. B. ZELINSKY Nikolai Dmitrievich // Imperial Moscow University: 1755-1917: encyclopedic dictionary / compiled by A. Yu. Andreev, D. A. Tsygankov. - M.: Russian Political Encyclopedia (ROSSPEN), 2010. - S. 254-255. — 894 p. - 2000 copies. — ISBN 978-5-8243-1429-8.
- Figurovsky N. A. Essay on the emergence and development of a coal gas mask by N. D. Zelinsky. M., 1952.
- Yuryev Yu. K., Levina R. Ya. Жизнь и деятельность академика Николая Дмитриевича Зелинского. Историческая серия. Моск. о-во испытателей природы. 27 March 2024. / Sci. ed. Ioffe S.T.; Moscow Society of Naturalists. — M.: MOIP, 1953. — 120 p. - (Historical series; No. 48). - 7000 copies.

== See also ==
- Hell–Volhard–Zelinsky halogenation
