= 35th Army Corps (Russian Empire) =

- Active: 1915–1918
- Country: Russian Empire
- Allegiance: Imperial Russian Army
- Engagements: World War I

The 35th Army Corps was an Army corps in the Imperial Russian Army.

== Composition ==
- 55th Infantry Division
- 67th Infantry Division

== Part of ==
- 2nd Army: 1915
- 4th Army: 1915 –1916
- 2nd Army: 1916
- 4th Army: 1916
- 2nd Army: 1917
- 10th Army: 1917
- 3rd Army: 1917

== Commanders ==
- April–July 1917: Gleb Vannovsky
