= 67th Infantry Division (Russian Empire) =

- 67-я пехотная дивизия
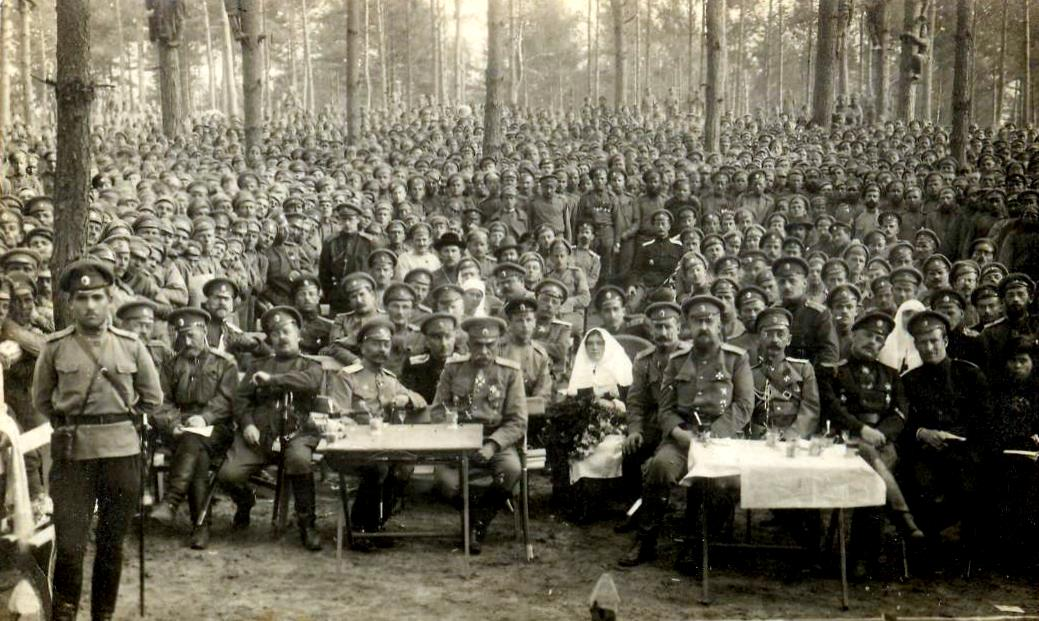
- Active: 1914–1918
- Country: Russian Empire; Russian Republic (from 1917)
- Branch: Imperial Russian Army; Russian Army (from 1917)
- Role: Infantry
- Engagements: World War I; Battle of Łódź (1914); Lake Naroch Offensive; Baranovichi Offensive

The 67th Infantry Division (Russian: 67-я пехотная дивизия, 67-ya Pekhotnaya Diviziya) was an infantry formation of the Russian Imperial Army.

== Organization ==
- 1st Brigade
  - 265th Infantry Regiment
  - 266th Infantry Regiment
- 2nd Brigade
  - 267th Infantry Regiment
  - 268th Infantry Regiment
- 67th Artillery Brigade
