= Baranovichi offensive =

Battle in World War I

- Part of the Eastern Front during World War I
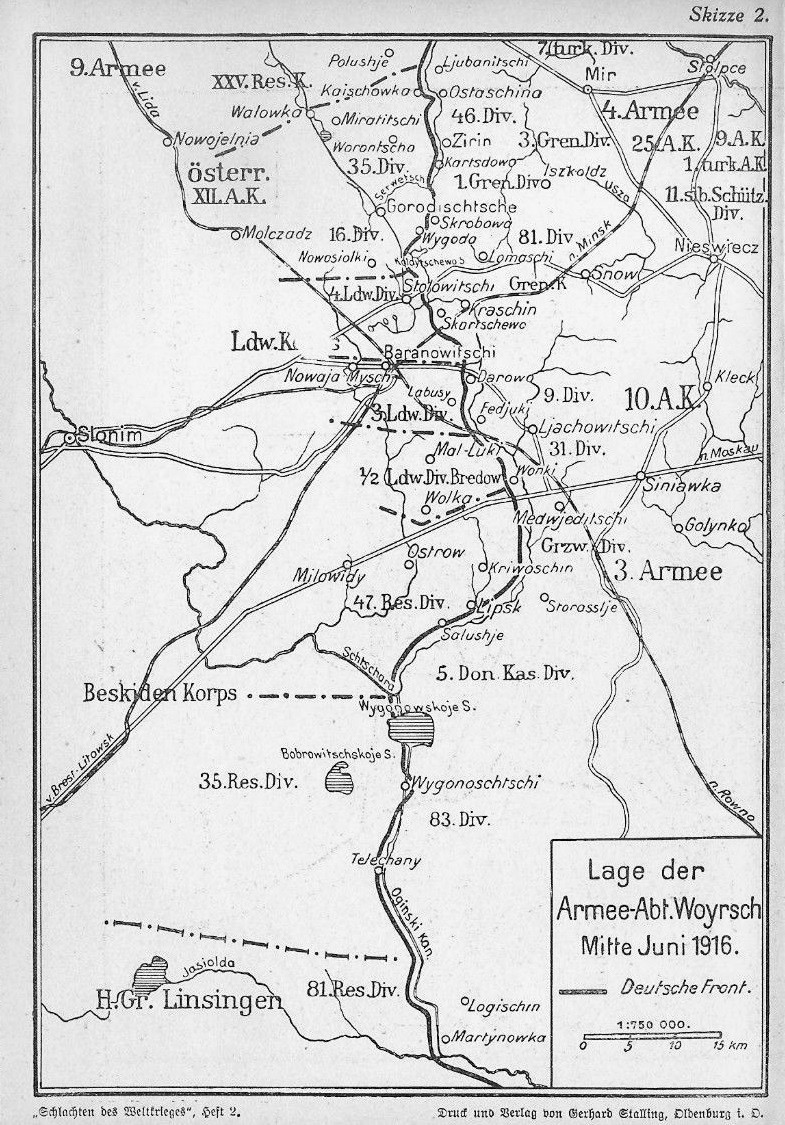
Date	3–25 July 1916
Location	Baranovichi (Then Russian Empire, present-day Belarus)
Result	Central Powers victory

Belligerents
Germany; Austria-Hungary	Russian Empire

Commanders and leaders
(German Empire) Prince Leopold of Bavaria (German Empire) Remus von Woyrsch	Alexei Evert; Alexander Ragoza

Strength
(German Empire) 9th Army	4th Army

Casualties and losses
13,000–40,000	80,000–120,000

The Baranovichi offensive was a battle fought on the Eastern Front during World War I between an army of Russia and the forces of Germany and Austria-Hungary in July 1916.

== Background ==
Concurrent to an attack by Russian Southwestern Front, the Russian Western Front was to launch an offensive in the direction of Vilna. However, the plan of attack was changed - instead of an attack on Vilna, the offensive was to target the area of Baranovichi. This change of direction came about due to orders from above, mediated in a vision to Grigory Rasputin, and accepted by the Tsar, as commander-in-chief. In early June 1916, the troops of the Southwestern Front began their offensive, achieving breakthroughs against the Austro-Hungarian army and advancing into Galicia. However, General A. E. Evert, commander of the Russian Western Front, twice postponed planned offensive towards Baranovichi, first on 31 May, then on 4 June, and then attempted to cancel the operation altogether. By order of Russian GHQ, General Evert was obliged to "attack the enemy on the front - Nowogrodek - Baranovichi" on 3 June.

== Battle ==
The Russian Fourth Army launched the first attack on 2 July with three army corps, but had stalled by the next day. The Russians revived the offensive on 4 July but again stalled after only two days of fighting. Under the cover of night on 8 July the Russians launched a third push but all Russian attacks were repulsed by the end of the following day. On 14 July the German Army counterattacked and took back all lost ground. A final Russian attempt was made from 25 to 29 July, but yet again failed.

== Results ==
Despite months of preparation and a sixfold advantage in manpower and artillery, the Russians failed to break through the fortified German positions, seizing only the first fortified line in some areas of the offensive which was then lost to German counterattacks.

== Literature ==
- John Keegan: Der erste Weltkrieg. Eine europaische Tragodie. Rowohlt-Taschenbuch-Verlag, Reinbek bei Hamburg 2001, ISBN 3-499-61194-5
- Norman Stone: The Eastern Front 1914–1917. Penguin Books Ltd., London 1998, ISBN 0-14-026725-5
- Christian Zentner: Der erste Weltkrieg. Daten, Fakten, Kommentare. Moewig, Rastatt 2000, ISBN 3-8118-1652-7

== Sources ==
- Oleynikov, Alexey (2016). Россия-щит Антанты. С предисловием Николая Старикова. [Russia – the shield of the Entente] (in Russian). Foreword by Nikolai Starikov. St. Petersburg: Peter. ISBN 978-5-496-01795-4.
