= 13th Army Corps (Russian Empire) =

- Active: 1877–1918
- Country: Russian Empire
- Branch: Imperial Russian Army
- Part of: Moscow Military District (peacetime)
- Garrison/HQ: Smolensk (peacetime)
- Engagements: Russo-Turkish War; World War I; Battle of Tannenberg

Commanders
- Notable commanders: Pavel Plehve; Alexei Evert; Mikhail Alekseyev

The 13th Army Corps was a corps of the Imperial Russian Army, formed in the 1870s. The corps fought in the Russo-Turkish War and World War I, and was disbanded with the collapse of the Imperial Russian Army after the Russian Revolution. During peacetime, it was stationed in the Moscow Military District.

== History ==
The corps was formed on 19 February 1877 in the Moscow Military District. Its headquarters was located at Smolensk before World War I. The corps fought in World War I. It was destroyed in East Prussia in late 1917 or early 1918.

== Organization ==
On 18 July 1914, the corps included the following units.

- 1st Infantry Division (Russian Empire)
  - 1st Brigade
    - 1st Neva Infantry Regiment
    - 2nd Sofia Infantry Regiment
  - 2nd Brigade
    - 3rd Narva Infantry Regiment
    - 4th Kopore Infantry Regiment
  - 1st Artillery Brigade
- 36th Infantry Division (Russian Empire)
  - 1st Brigade
    - 141st Mozhaysk Infantry Regiment
    - 142nd Zvenigorod Infantry Regiment
  - 2nd Brigade
    - 143rd Dorogobuzh Infantry Regiment
    - 144th Kashira Infantry Regiment
- 2nd Cavalry Brigade
  - 17th Separate Chernigov Hussars Regiment
  - 18th Separate Nizhyn Hussars Regiment
- 13th Mortar Artillery Division
- 5th Heavy Artillery Battalion
- 13th Sapper Battalion

== Subordination ==
- 2nd Army (from 2 August 1914)
- 12th Army (15 January – 1 May 1916)
- 1st Army (21 June – 17 July 1916)
- 12th Army (1 August – 11 November 1916)
- 5th Army (15 September – 16 July 1917)
- 12th Army (to December 1917)

== Commanders ==
- Pavel Plehve: 1905-1906
- Alexei Evert: 1908-1912
- Mikhail Alekseyev: 1912-1914
- Lieutenant General Nikolai Klyuev (July – August 1914)
- Lieutenant General Polikarp Kuznetsov (January 1916 – September 1917)
- Major General Pavel Adzhiyev (September–October 1917)
- Lieutenant General Anton Symon (October 1917)
