= 1st Infantry Division (Russian Empire) =

- 1-я пехотная дивизия
- Active: 1811 – 1918
- Country: Russian Empire
- Branch: (Russian Empire) Russian Imperial Army
- Role: Infantry
- Size: approx. 20,000
- Garrison/HQ: Smolensk
- Engagements: Russo-Japanese War; World War I; Russian invasion of East Prussia

The 1st Infantry Division (Russian: 1-я пехотная дивизия, 1-ya Pekhotnaya Diviziya) was an infantry formation of the Russian Imperial Army that existed in various formations from 1811 until the end of World War I and the Russian Revolution. From at least 1903 to the end of its existence the division was based in Smolensk.

== History ==
It was initially formed in 1811 as the 25th Infantry Division, and renumbered as the 1st in 1820. The division took part in the Russo-Japanese War and was located in Manchuria during that time. In August 1914 it was part of the 2nd Army of the Northwestern Front. It was completely destroyed during the Russian invasion of East Prussia by September of that year and was reformed in December 1914. In 1915–17 it was assigned to the 12th Army, 5th Army, and later the 1st Army. It was demobilized around the time of the Russian Revolution and the subsequent unrest.

== Organization ==
Russian infantry divisions consisted of a staff, two infantry brigades, and one artillery brigade. It was part of the 13th Army Corps as of 1914.

- 1st Brigade
  - 1st Neva Infantry Regiment
  - 2nd Sofia Infantry Regiment
- 2nd Brigade
  - 3rd Narva Infantry Regiment
  - 4th Koporye Infantry Regiment
- 1st Artillery Brigade

== Known commanders ==
	Name	From	To
1	Lieutenant General Nikolai Bardovsky	1883	1887
2	Lieutenant General Mikhail Shulgin	24.08.1892	9.01.1900
3	Lieutenant General Vladimir Pensky	1900	1904
4	Lieutenant General Alexander Brilevich	6.12.1904	26.10.1905
5	General of Infantry Dmitry Zuyev	21.06.1907	16.06.1910
6	Lieutenant General Andrei Ugryumov	2.07.1910	after 1.03.1916
7	Major General Luka Kondratovich	5.03.1916	after 3.01.1917
8	Major General Silvestras Žukauskas	18.05.1917	?

== Known chiefs of staff ==
	Name	From	To
1	Colonel Mikhail Markov	17.01.1878	27.05.1879
2	Colonel Mikhail Ivanov	10.05.1892	4.02.1898
3	Colonel Baron Alexander von Taube	25.10.1901	4.10.1904
4	Colonel Alexander Davydov	2.08.1910	19.06.1912
5	Colonel Ivan Kashcheyev	1913	1.07.1914
