= 3rd Narva Infantry Regiment =

- Нарвский 3-й пехотный полк
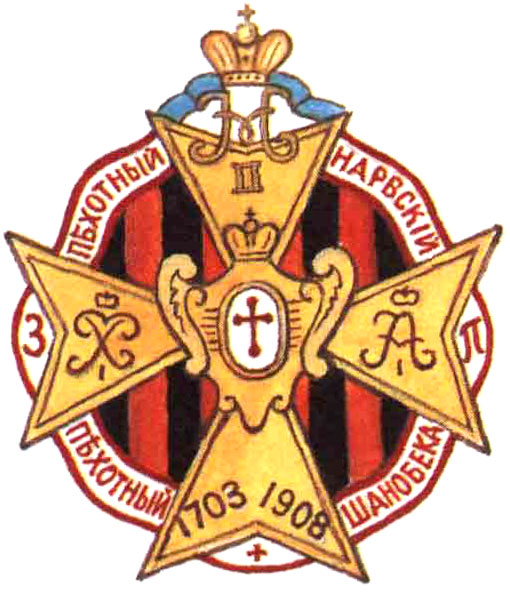
- The regimental insignia commemorating the 200th anniversary of the regiment
- Active: 1703 - 1918
- Country: Russian Empire
- Branch: Imperial Russian Army; Russian Army (1917)
- Type: Infantry
- Garrison/HQ: Smolensk
- Anniversaries: August 9th, the regimental holiday
- Engagements: Siege of Narva (1704); Battle of Poltava; Siege of Riga (1709–1710); Battle of Borodino; Battle of Laon; World War I

The 3rd Narva Infantry Regiment (Russian: Нарвский 3-й пехотный полк) is an infantry regiment of the Imperial Russian Army. It was established in 1703 and was disbanded in 1918 during the collapse of the Russian Empire. From 1833, it was part of the 1st Infantry Division.

== History ==
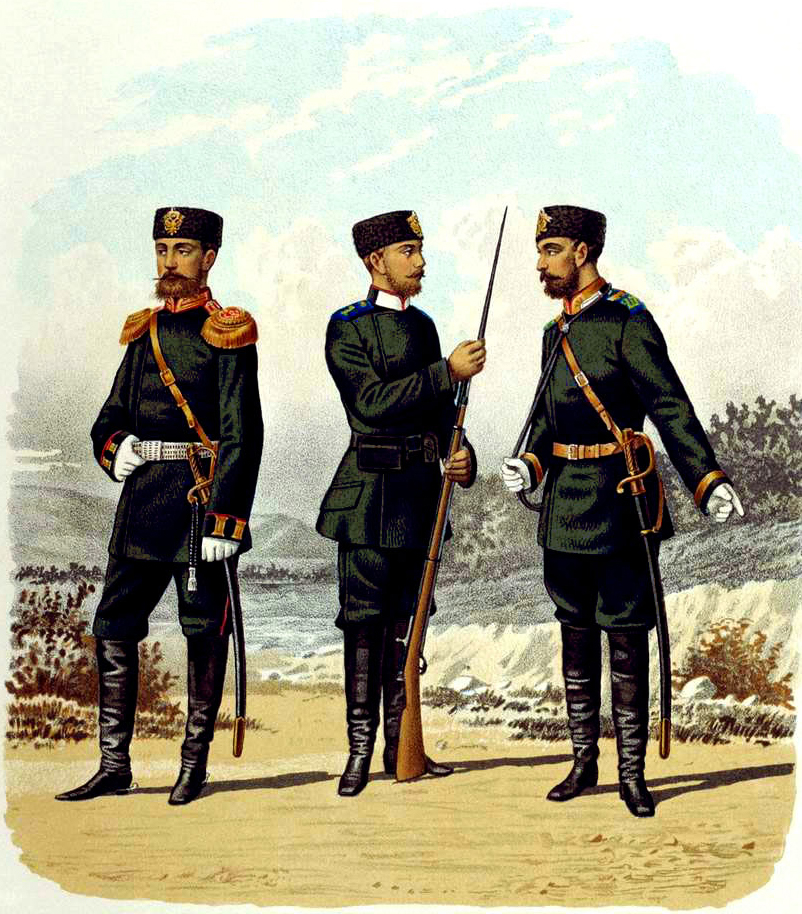
On the right, is a private belonging to the 3rd Narva Infantry Regiment.

The regiment was formed on December 6th, 1703. The regiment then was sent to fight in the Siege of Narva. On August 25 to August 26 of 1812 the regiment was sent to fight at the Battle of Borodino. In 1814, the regiment was deployed to the Battle of Laon. On January 28th 1833, during the general reorganization of the infantry army, the 1st (formerly the 20th) Jaeger Regiment was annexed by the 3rd Narva Infantry Regiment and was repurposed into its 3rd, 4th and 6th reserve battalions. In the Battle of Tannenberg, the regiment and the entirety of the 13th Army Corps which the regiment belonged to, was completely obliterated by the German Army. It was dissolved by the Bolsheviks in 1918 and some of its members fought for the White movement in the Russian Civil War.

== Organization ==
In 1914, the regiment was a part of the 2nd Infantry Brigade, which belongs to the 1st Infantry Division of the 13th Corps.

== Commanders ==
- 1703 — 1705 — Adam Andreevich von Schanobek
- 1705 — 1708 — Gavriil Golovkin
- 1708 — 1727 — Lieutenant Colonel (from 12.07.1709 Colonel) Semyon Ivanovich Sukin
- 26.11.1727 — 29.04.1728 — Colonel Prince Karl of Hesse-Homburg
- 1730 — 1731 — Colonel Fyodor Weideng
- 29.12.1731 — 1734 — Colonel Yakov Yakovlevich Protasov
- 19.04.1734 — 08.11.1737 — Colonel Andrey Adamovich (Heinrich Ernst) von Ponickau
- 1737 — 1749 — Colonel Samoylo Yakovlevich Karathel
- 25.04.1749 — 1751 — Colonel Ivan Fedorovich Vietinghoff-Scheel
- 25.04.1752 — 25.12.1755 — Colonel Sevastyan Angorn de Hartvis
- 25.12.1755 — 01.06.1758 — Colonel Christopher Yuryevich von Essen
- 01.06.1758 — 1761 — Colonel Karl Yuryevich (Ernst Karl) von Dunten
- 25.12.1761 — 24.03.1765 — Colonel Fyodor Ivanovich Dmitriev-Mamonov
- 19.04.1765 — 1769 — Colonel Vasily Ushakov
- 30.10.1769 — 01.03.1774 — Colonel Prince Ivan Borisovich Golitsyn
- 15.03.1774 — 24.11.1780 — Colonel Ivan Andreevich Tatishchev
- 1782 — 1784 — Colonel Mikhail Afanasyevich Mashkov
- 1784 — 05.02.1790 — Brigadier Khristofor Ivanovich von Benckendorff
- 11.02.1790 — 01.01.1795 — Colonel Khristofor Ivanovich Miller
- 01.01.1795 — 16.11.1797 — Colonel Nikolai Ivanovich Borisov
- 12.08.1798 — 05.10.1798 — Colonel Danila Ivanovich Stremoukhov
- 24.12.1798 — 21.03.1800 — Major Matvey Antonovich Stoessel
- 21.03.1800 — 30.01.1805 — Major General Pyotr Spiridonovich Cheremisinov
- 30.01.1805 — 20.11.1805 — Colonel Prince Aleksandr Vasilyevich Sibirsky
- 20.11.1805 — 04.05.1808 — Colonel Aleksandr Andreevich Rakovsky
- 30.08.1808 — 21.01.1809 — Colonel Vasily Ivanovich Harpe
- 21.01.1809 — 30.09.1809 — Colonel Nikolai Semyonovich Kuzikov
- 30.09.1809 — 20.01.1811 — Colonel Mikhail Semyonovich Vorontsov
- 20.01.1811 — 17.06.1815 — Major General Andrey Vasilyevich Bogdanovsky
- 17.06.1815 — 19.01.1816 — Colonel Ivan Stepanovich Bukhvostov
- 19.01.1816 — 03.07.1817 — Colonel Pyotr Mikhailovich Kamensky
- 02.10.1817 — 05.02.1823 — Colonel Vladimir Afanasyevich Obruchev
- 28.03.1823 — 01.02.1831 — Colonel Varfolomey Konstantinovich Tarlovsky
- 01.02.1831 — 05.06.1843 — Major General Ivan Nikolaevich Khotyaintsev
- 03.07.1843 — 06.07.1845 — Colonel Ivan Danilovich Gushchin
- 06.07.1845 — 23.01.1852 — Major General Fyodor Ivanovich Tolstoy
- 23.01.1852 — 11.10.1854 — Colonel (from 30.03.1852 Major General) Evgeny Mikhailovich Zhukovsky
- 11.10.1854 — 15.05.1855 — Colonel Burgard Adolfovich Nat
- 15.05.1855 — 03.01.1857 — Lieutenant Colonel (from 30.08.1855 Colonel) Baron Fyodor Maksimovich Bilsky
- 03.01.1857 — 24.05.1863 — Colonel Baron Eduard Karlovich Delingshausen
- 24.05.1863 — 13.04.1866 — Colonel Vasily Ivanovich Irdibenev
- 13.04.1866 — 20.02.1870 — Colonel Yakov Stepanovich Krizhanovsky
- 20.02.1870 — 30.10.1874 — Colonel Aleksandr Kondratyevich Sheleikhovsky
- 30.10.1874 — 31.10.1877 — Colonel Albert Gustavovich Rut
- 31.10.1877 — 23.04.1881 — Colonel Dmitry Nikolaevich Leslie
- 23.04.1881 — 22.10.1886 — Colonel Nikolai Aleksandrovich Dametti
- 01.11.1886 — 16.09.1889 — Colonel Boleslav Matveevich Rutkovsky
- 06.10.1889 — 14.03.1894 — Colonel Aleksandr Ivanovich Vatropin
- 24.03.1894 — 03.01.1895 — Colonel Iosif Fyodorovich Schamberger
- 13.01.1895 — 14.01.1898 — Colonel Vladimir Vladimirovich Aleksandrov
- 04.02.1898 — 22.02.1904 — Colonel Nil Aleksandrovich Yashchin
- 07.03.1904 — 05.09.1904 — Colonel Aleksandr Nikolaevich Stupin
- 04.10.1904 — 07.10.1907 — Colonel Alexander von Taube
- 13.10.1907 — 16.11.1912 — Colonel Ivan Alekseevich Voskresensky
- 16.11.1912 — 15.08.1914 — Colonel Nikolai Grigoryevich Zapolsky
- 27.01.1916 — 07.02.1917 — Colonel Konstantin Lavrentyevich Dymman
- 27.03.1917 — 27.06.1917 — Colonel Baron Dmitry Nikolaevich Pritvits
- 27.06.1917 — after 28.08.1917 — Colonel Nikolai Pavlovich Samovolov
- 13.10.1907 — 16.11.1912 — Colonel Voskresensky, Ivan Alekseevich
- 16.11.1912 — 15.08.1914 — Colonel Zapolsky, Nikolai Grigoryevich
- 27.01.1916 — 07.02.1917 — Colonel Dymman, Konstantin Lavrentyevich
- 27.03.1917 — 27.06.1917 — Colonel Baron Pritvits, Dmitry Nikolaevich
- 27.06.1917 — after 28.08.1917 — Colonel Samovolov, Nikolai Pavlovich
