= 29th Army Corps (Russian Empire) =

- Country: Russian Empire
- Allegiance: Imperial Russian Army
- Engagements: World War I; Gorlice–Tarnów Offensive

The 29th Army Corps was an Army corps in the Imperial Russian Army.

== Part of ==
- 11th Army: 1914 - 1915
- 3rd Army: 1915
- 13th Army: 1915
- 3rd Army: 1915 - 1916
- 6th Army: 1917
- 9th Army: 1917

== Commanders ==
- 1914-1915: Dmitry Zuyev
