= 36th Infantry Division (Russian Empire) =

- 36-я пехотная дивизия
- Active: 1914–1918
- Country: Russian Empire
- Branch: Russian Imperial Army
- Role: Infantry

The 36th Infantry Division (Russian: 36-я пехо́тная диви́зия, 36-ya Pekhotnaya Diviziya) was an infantry formation of the Russian Imperial Army.

== Organization ==
It was part of the 13th Army Corps.

- 1st Brigade
  - 141st Mozhaysk Infantry Regiment
  - 142nd Zvenigorod Infantry Regiment
- 2nd Brigade
  - 143rd Dorogobuzh Infantry Regiment
  - 144th Kashira Infantry Regiment
- 36th Artillery Brigade
