= Nikolai Bardovsky =

Russian military officer (1832–1890)

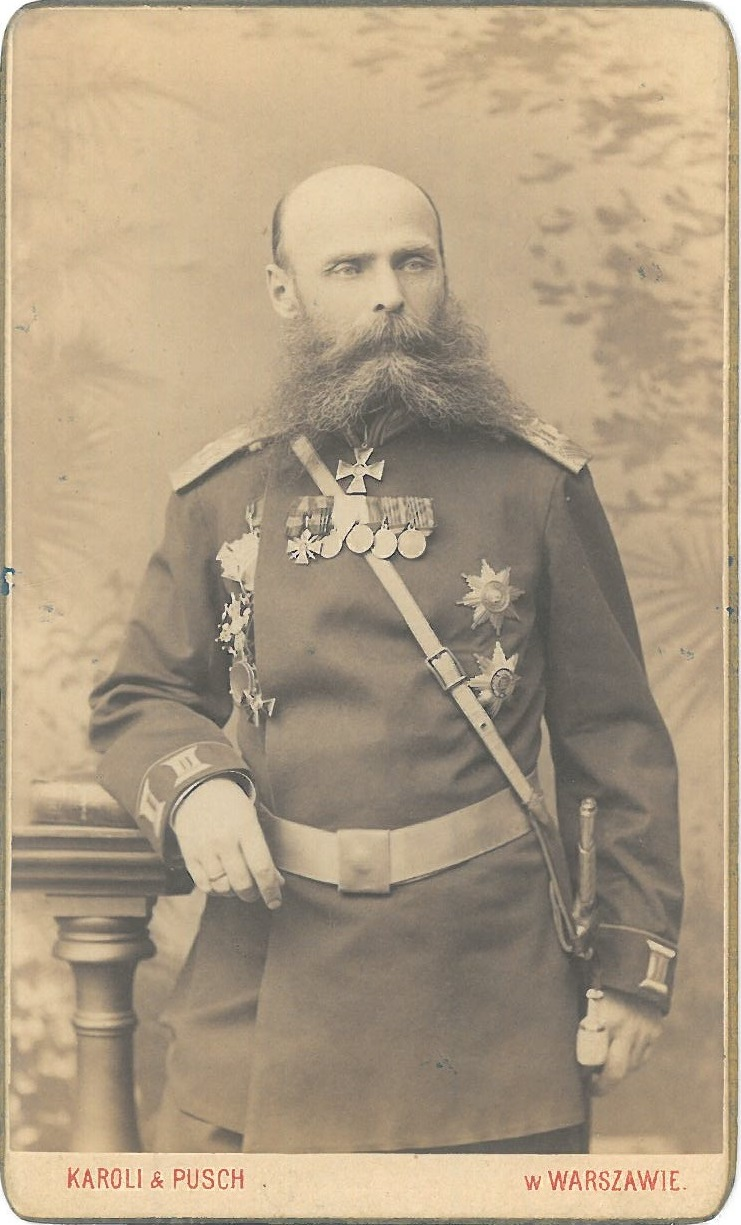

Nikolai Bardovsky (9 December 1832 – 27 August 1890) was a Russian Imperial Army lieutenant general. He was a recipient of the Order of St. Vladimir, the Order of St. Anna, the Order of Saint Stanislaus (Russian) and the Gold Sword for Bravery. He commanded the 1st Infantry Division from 1883 to 1887.

== Sources ==
- Кенисарин А. Султаны Кенисара и Садык. — Ташкент, 1889.
- Бардовский, Николай Федорович // Русский биографический словарь : в 25 томах. — Санкт-Петербур, 1900. — Т. 2: Алексинский — Бестужев-Рюмин. — С. 500.
- Список генералам по старшинству на 1886 год. — СПб., 1886.
- Терентьев М. А. История завоевания Средней Азии. — СПб., 1903. — Т. 2.
