= Dmitry Zuyev =

Imperial Russian Army general (1854–1917)

Dmitry Petrovich Zuyev
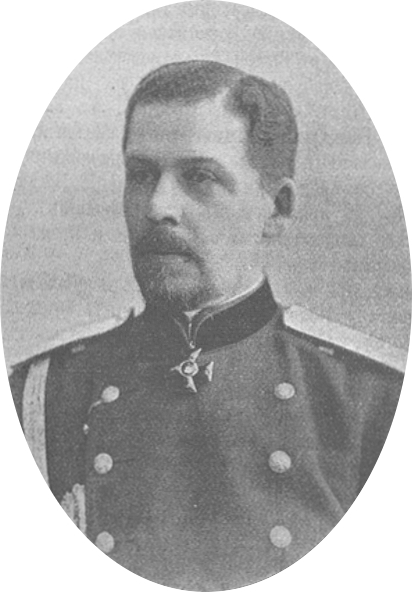
- Born: 23 June 1854
- Died: 17 September 1917 (aged 63) Petrograd, Russian Republic
- Allegiance: Russian Empire
- Branch: (Russian Empire) Imperial Russian Army
- Service years: 1870–1917
- Rank: General of the Infantry
- Commands: 1st Infantry Division; 25th Army Corps; 29th Army Corps
- Conflicts: Russo-Turkish War; World War I

Dmitry Petrovich Zuyev (23 June [O.S. 11 June] 1854 – 4 September 1917) was an Imperial Russian Army general.

He was commander of the 1st Infantry Division from 1907 to 1910. He fought in the Russo-Turkish War of 1877–1878 and the Eastern Front of World War I. He commanded the 25th (1910-1914) and the 29th Army Corps (1914-1915). In September 1915 he was appointed commander of the Dvinsk Military District.

After the February Revolution, he was removed from office and enlisted in the reserve of ranks at the headquarters of the Petrograd military district.
He died on 4 (17) September 1917 in Petrograd.

He was a recipient of the Order of St. Alexander Nevsky, the Order of the White Eagle, the Order of St. Vladimir, the Order of St. Anna and the Order of Saint Stanislaus.

== Awards ==
- Order of St. Anna, 4th Class, 1878; 3rd Class, 1884; 2nd Class, 1891; 1st Class, 1904
- Order of St. Stanislaus, 3rd Class with Swords and Bow, 1878; 2nd Class, 1887; 1st Class, 1900
- Order of St. Vladimir, 4th Class, 1893; 3rd Class, 1895; 2nd Class, 1907
- Order of the White Eagle, 6 December 1912
- Order of St. Alexander Nevsky, with Swords, 18 March 1915; and Diamond Badges, 1 May 1915

== Bibliography ==
- А.И. Колпакиди, ed. (2004). Энциклопедия секретных служб России. М.: АСТ, Астрель, Транзиткнига. pp. 107–108. ISBN 5-17018975-3.

Preceded by None	Commander of the 25th Army Corps; 1910–1914	Succeeded by Alexander Ragoza
Preceded by None	Commander of the 29th Army Corps; 1914–1915	Succeeded by Nikolai Lisovsky
