= 25th Army Corps (Russian Empire) =

- Country: Russian Empire
- Allegiance: Imperial Russian Army
- Engagements: World War I; Battle of the Vistula River; Battle of Galicia

The 25th Army Corps was an Army corps in the Imperial Russian Army.

== Composition ==
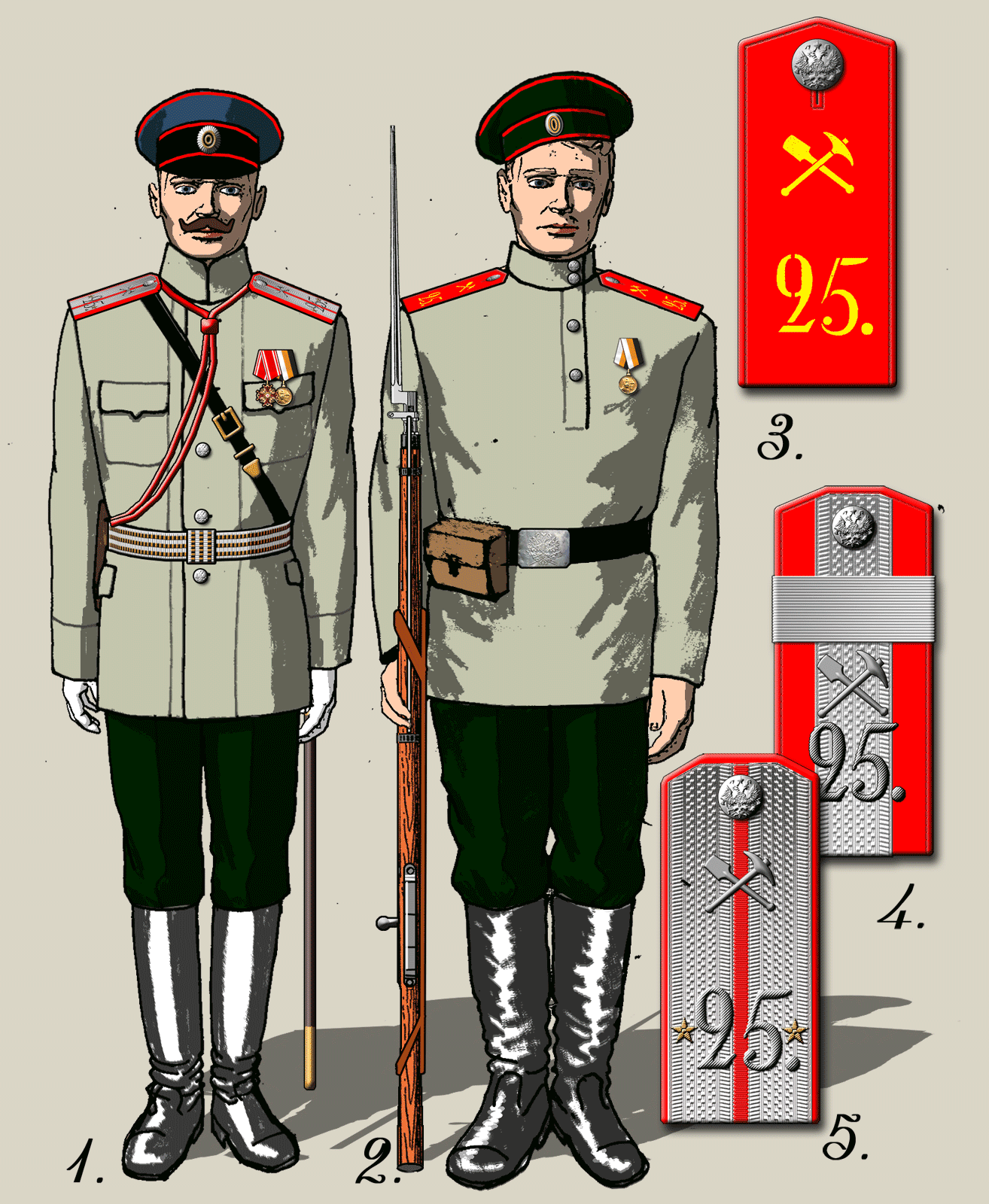

- 3rd Grenadier Division
- 46th Infantry Division

== Part of ==
- 5th Army: 1914
- 9th Army: 1914 - 1915
- 4th Army: 1915
- 3rd Army: 1915 - 1916
- 4th Army: 1916
- 2nd Army: 1916
- Russian Special Army: 1916 - 1917
- 11th Army: 1917

== Commanders ==
- 1910-1914: Dmitry Zuyev
- 1914-1915: Alexander Ragoza
- 1915-1916: Yuri Danilov
- 1916-1917: Lavr Kornilov
