= 2nd Sofia Infantry Regiment =

Coordinates: 54.7831°N 32.0363°E

- 2-й Софийский пехотный полк
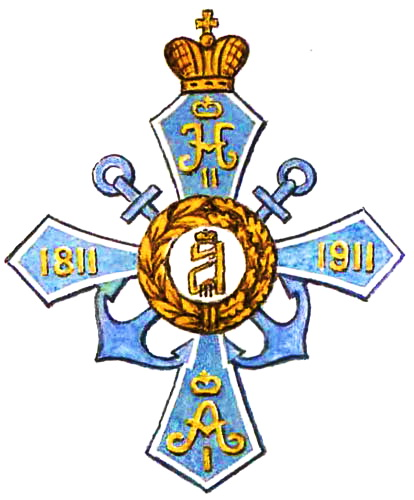
- Active: 1811–1918
- Country: Russian Empire
- Branch: (Russian Empire) Russian Imperial Army
- Role: Infantry
- Garrison/HQ: Smolensk
- Patron: Alexander III of Russia
- Anniversaries: April 23
- Engagements: Patriotic War of 1812; World War I; Russian invasion of East Prussia

The 2nd Emperor Alexander III's Sofia Infantry Regiment (Russian: 2-й пехотный Софийский Императора Александра III полк) was an infantry regiment of the Russian Imperial Army. By 1914, the 2nd Sofia Infantry Regiment was part of the 1st Infantry Division, and it fought in World War I before being dissolved in 1918 after the Russian Revolution.

== History ==
The unit was founded on 17 January 1811 as the 49th Egersky Regiment. In March of that year it was renamed Sofia Infantry Regiment and in 1833 the 2nd naval regiment was attached to the unit. Later in 1833 the regiment was renamed the Sofia Naval Regiment before its name was changed back in 1856. On 6 April 1863 three battalions of the regiment were taken to form a new Sofia reserve infantry regiment. The following year it was renamed the 2nd Sofia Infantry Regiment and in December 1877 it gained the title of "His Imperial Highness the Heir and Tsarevich's Sofia Infantry Regiment". In February 1881 it became "His Majesty's" and on 11 February 1894 it became the 2nd Emperor Alexander III's Sofia Infantry Regiment.

== Combat chronicle ==
The Sofia Regiment fought in the defense of Smolensk in 1812 during the French invasion of Russia, fighting off a French attack as part of the 7th Infantry Division against Mstislav and Roslavl districts of the city. About 200 men of the unit were killed or missing.

During World War I, it was part of the 1st Infantry Division and took part in the Battle of Tannenberg. The 2nd Sofia Infantry Regiment was dissolved in 1918 after the Russian Revolution.

== Memorial ==
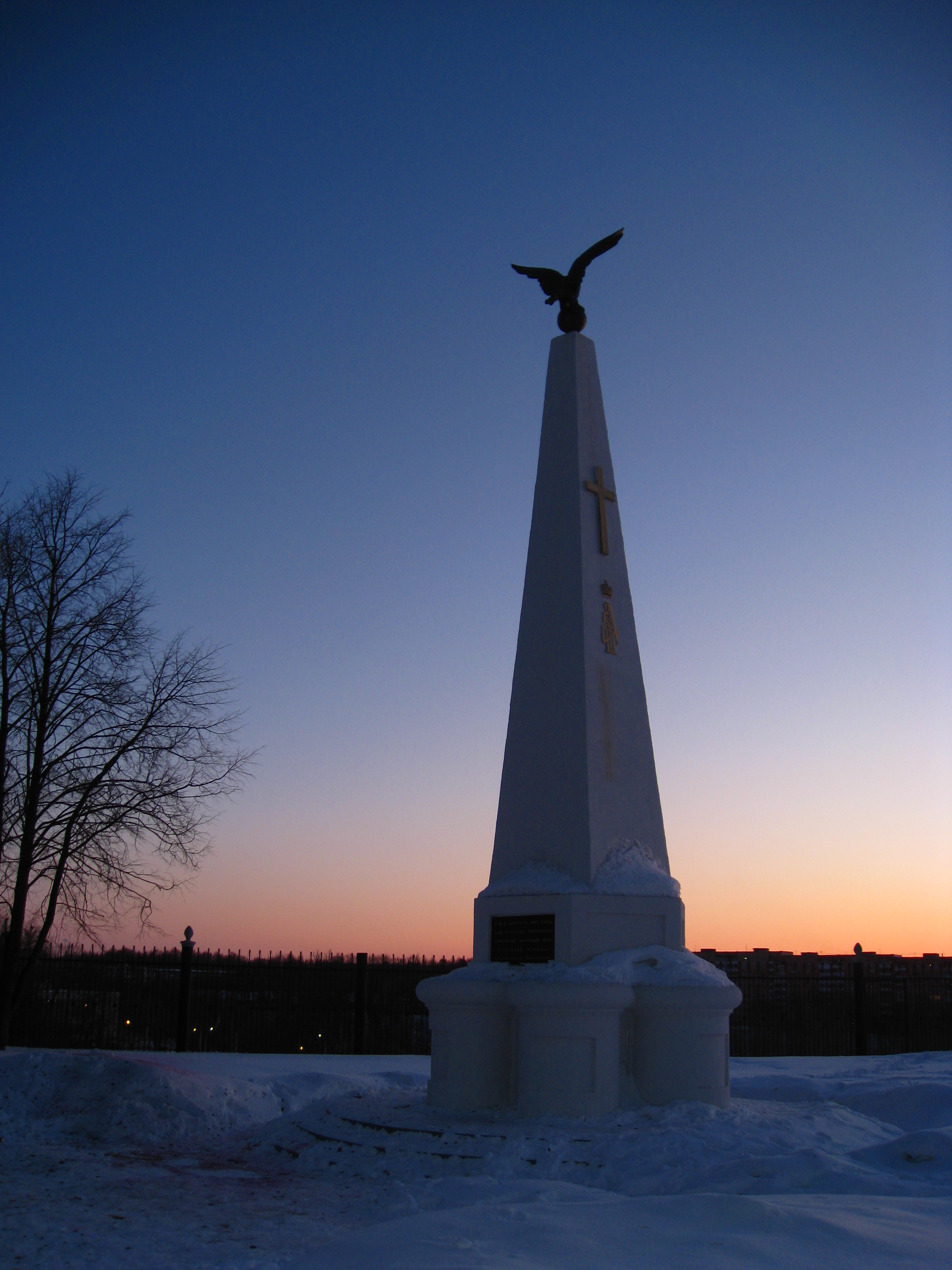
The Sofia regiment memorial in Smolensk

A memorial for the Sofia Regiment was built in its city of origin, Smolensk, on 5 August 1912 at the Lopatinsky Park. It was made on the 100th anniversary in the victory during the Patriotic War of 1812 against France, commemorating the regiment's participation in the conflict. The memorial was made by a private of the regiment's 7th company. It consists of a period held up by six columns in a circular base. On the side it has a cross and the regimental insignia, while on the top there is an imperial eagle.
