= 1st Neva Infantry Regiment =

Imperial Russian Military unit

- 1-й Невский пехотный полк
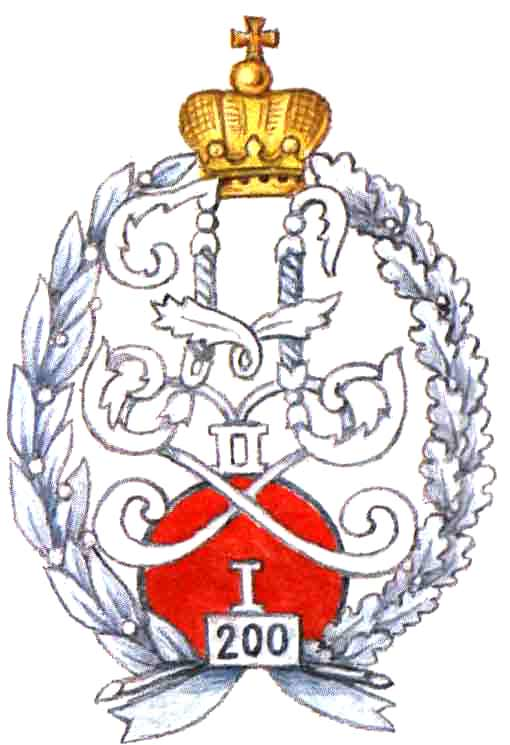
- Active: 1706–1918
- Country: Russian Empire
- Branch: (Russian Empire) Russian Imperial Army
- Role: Infantry
- Garrison/HQ: Roslavl
- Patron: Peter Lacy
- Anniversaries: August 30
- Engagements: Great Northern War; Seven Years' War; Russo-Turkish War (1768–74); Russo-Swedish War (1788–90); Finnish War; Russo-Turkish War (1877–78); Russo–Japanese War; World War I

The 1st General Field Marshal Count Lacy's, now His Majesty King of the Hellenes' Neva Infantry Regiment (Russian: 1-й пехотный Невский генерал-фельдмаршала графа Ласси, ныне Его Величества Короля Эллинов полк) was an infantry regiment of the Russian Imperial Army. It was known by different names for much of its existence but most of its designations included "Neva Infantry Regiment." It served in several conflicts, including the Great Northern War, Seven Years' War, the Russo-Swedish War of 1808–1809, the Russo-Turkish War of 1877–78, and the Russo–Japanese War. By 1914, the 1st Neva Infantry Regiment was part of the 1st Infantry Division, and it fought in World War I before being dissolved in 1918, after the events of Russian Revolution.

== Organization ==
The original unit was formed in Saint Petersburg on 21 July 1706 as the "Kulikov Infantry Regiment" by order of Russian Emperor Peter the Great. On 10 April 1708 it was renamed "Neva Regiment" and in 1711 it became the "Neva Infantry Regiment". On 16 August 1712 its surviving members were merged into various other regiments after the heavy losses of the Great Northern War. On 15 July 1713 a new Neva Regiment was created, named after the original. In 1727 it was briefly designated as the "2nd Vladimir Infantry Regiment" before being renamed "Neva" again. It was disbanded and reformed in 1731 and a decade later its total strength was 1,557 men. By 1753 the regiment's battalions each consisted of one grenadier and four fusilier companies, for a total strength of 2,859 men.

In the mid-1750s two of its grenadier companies were reassigned to form other units. In 1762 the Neva Regiment was reformed and came to consist of 3 fusilier battalions, each of which included one grenadier and four fusilier companies. The following year it gained two new battalions, and its official strength was listed as 2,092 men during wartime and 1,880 during peacetime. On 29 November 1796 it was renamed "Neva Musketeer Regiment". On 31 October 1798 it was renamed "1st Lieutenant General Duke Volkonsky's Musketeer Regiment" and later "Lieutenant General Duke Gorchakov's" on 26 January 1800. In 1800 its numerical designation was changed to 2nd before being renamed "Neva Musketeer Regiment" on 31 March 1801. In 1811 it was renamed "Neva Infantry Regiment". In January 1833 the 1st naval battalion was added to the unit, and it was later renamed the "Neva Naval Regiment". In 1846 it became the "His Majesty King of Naples Regiment" before being changed back to "Neva Infantry Regiment" the following year.

In April 1863 it lost three battalions which were reassigned to form the new "Neva Reserve Infantry Regiment". It was in 1867 that it first gained the name of "1st His Majesty King of the Hellenes' Infantry Regiment". In 1913 it was renamed "1st Neva Infantry Regiment". Part of the unit was transferred to form the new 221st Roslavl Infantry Regiment in August 1914, and the unit was disbanded in 1918.

== Combat chronicle ==
The regiment saw its first action during the Great Northern War, fighting in the Battle of Poltava (1709), Battle of Vyborg Bay (1711), and during a naval battle that resulted in the capture of four frigates (1719). From 1716 to 1717 it took part in a 20-month march through Prussia to the shores of Sweden. The Neva Regiment took heavy losses during the conflict. In 1760, during the Seven Years' War, the regiment was decorated for taking part in the raid on Berlin. It might also have taken part in the Russo-Turkish War (1768–74) and the Russo-Swedish War (1788–90).

In 1812 it took part in fighting the French invasion of Russia and until 1815 the regiment was fighting abroad, including at the Battle of Leipzig. The Neva Infantry Regiment later took part in crushing the January Uprising in Russian Congress Poland. It later fought in the Russo-Turkish War of 1877–78, during which the regiment's 1st battalion earned a decoration for distinguished service in battle. In 1905 the unit was deployed to Manchuria to fight in the Russo–Japanese War, but the conflict ended by the time they arrived in Harbin. Between 1907 and 1908 the regiment took part in putting down revolutionary unrest in Voronezh. During that time all men of the unit received a marking which stated "For Accomplishment in the Turkish War of 1877 and 1878."

During World War I the 1st Neva Infantry Regiment participated in the East Prussian Operation, including the Battle of Tannenberg, in 1914 and was part of the 1st Infantry Division. It saw action as part of 2nd Army, 10th Army, 5th Army, and 12th Army; on the Northwestern Front and the Northern Front. It was dissolved by the Bolsheviks in 1918 and some of its members fought for the White movement in the Russian Civil War.

== Rank insignia ==
=== Officers ===
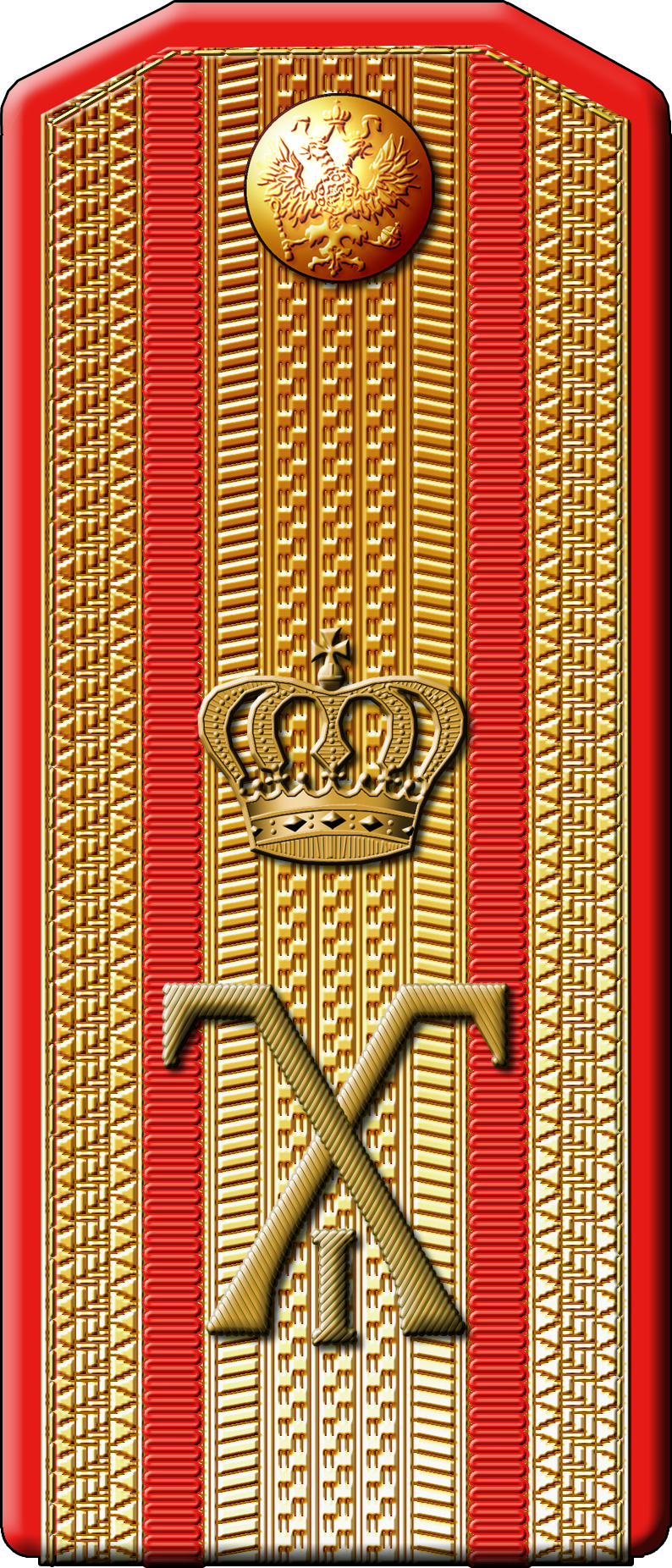
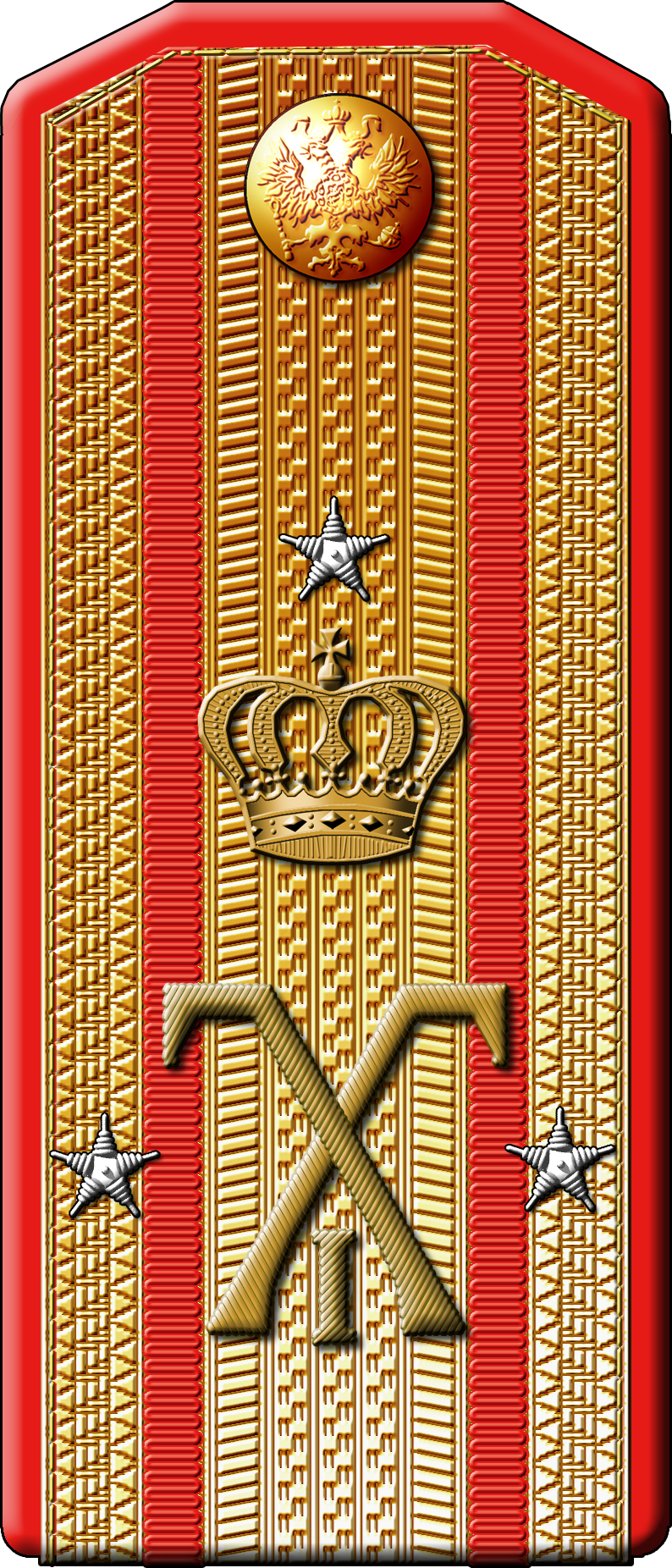
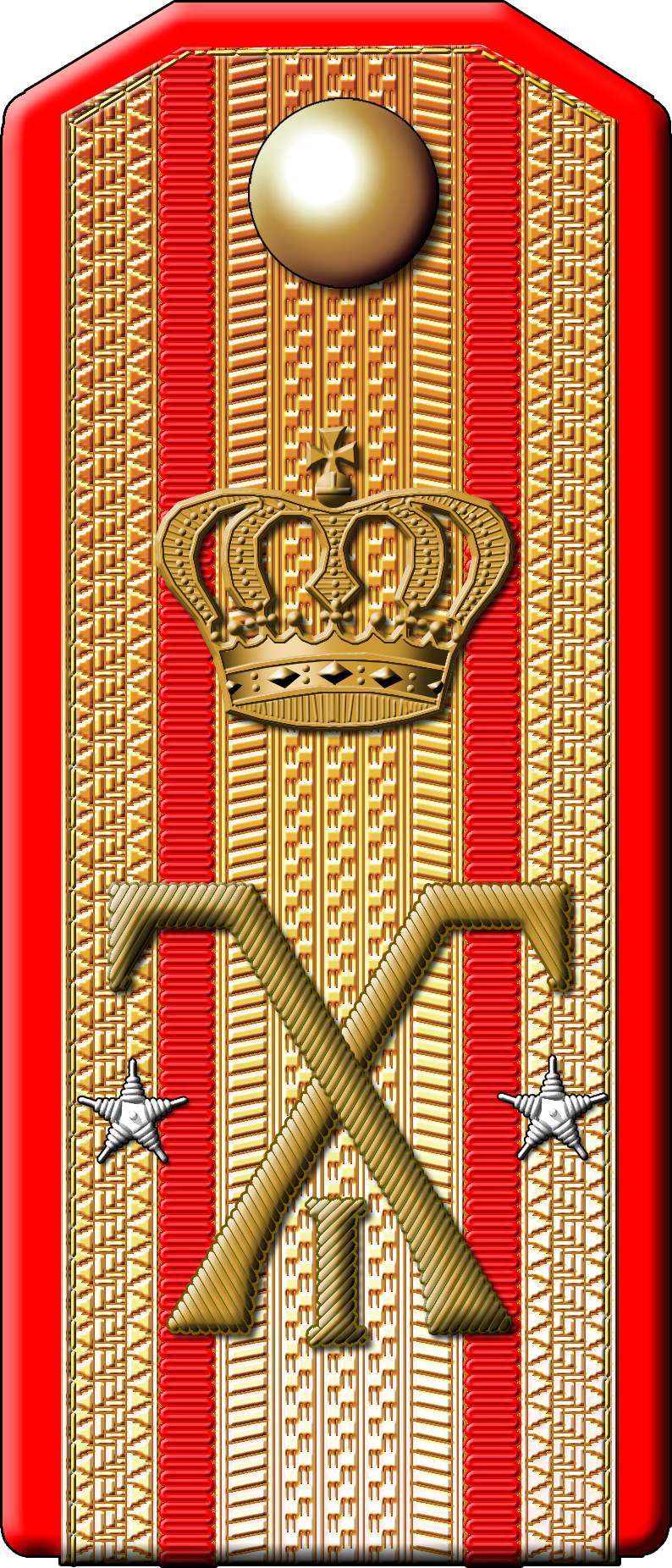
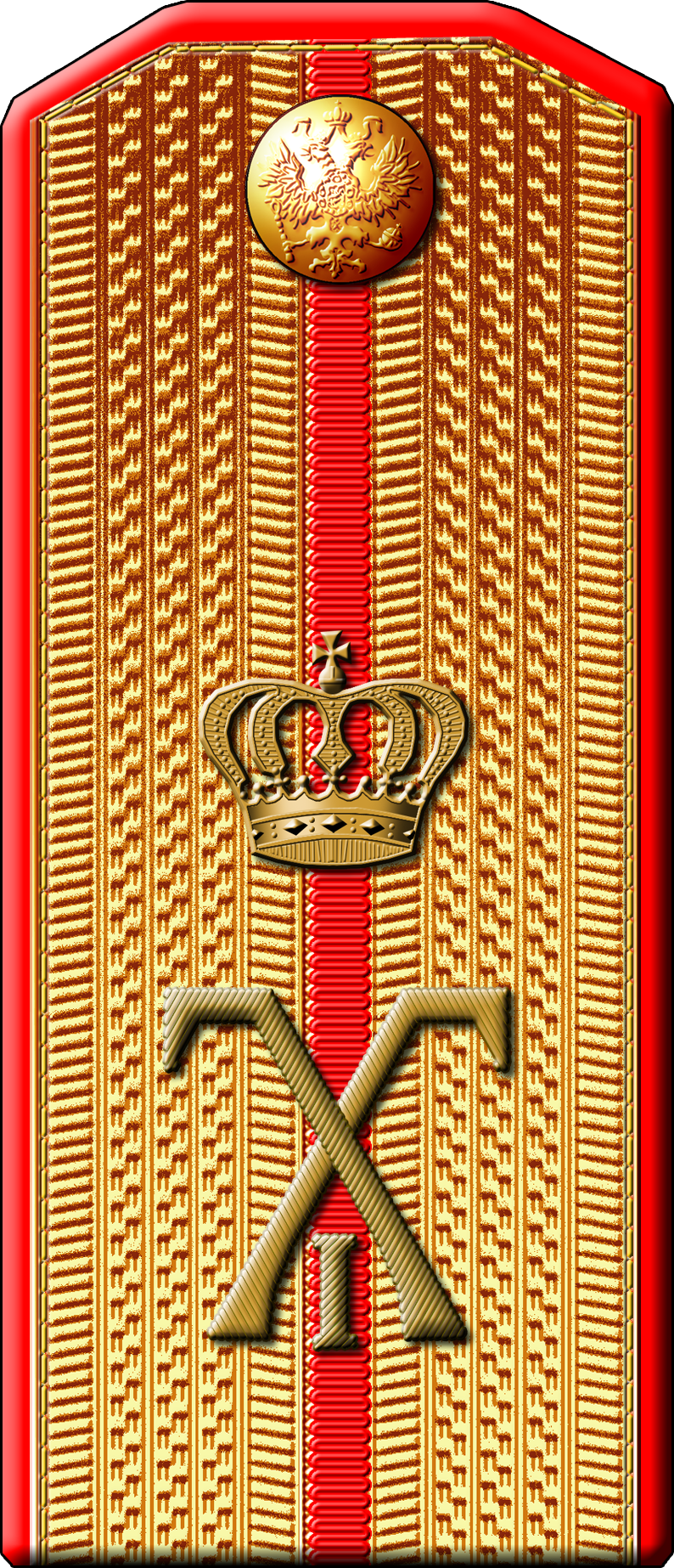
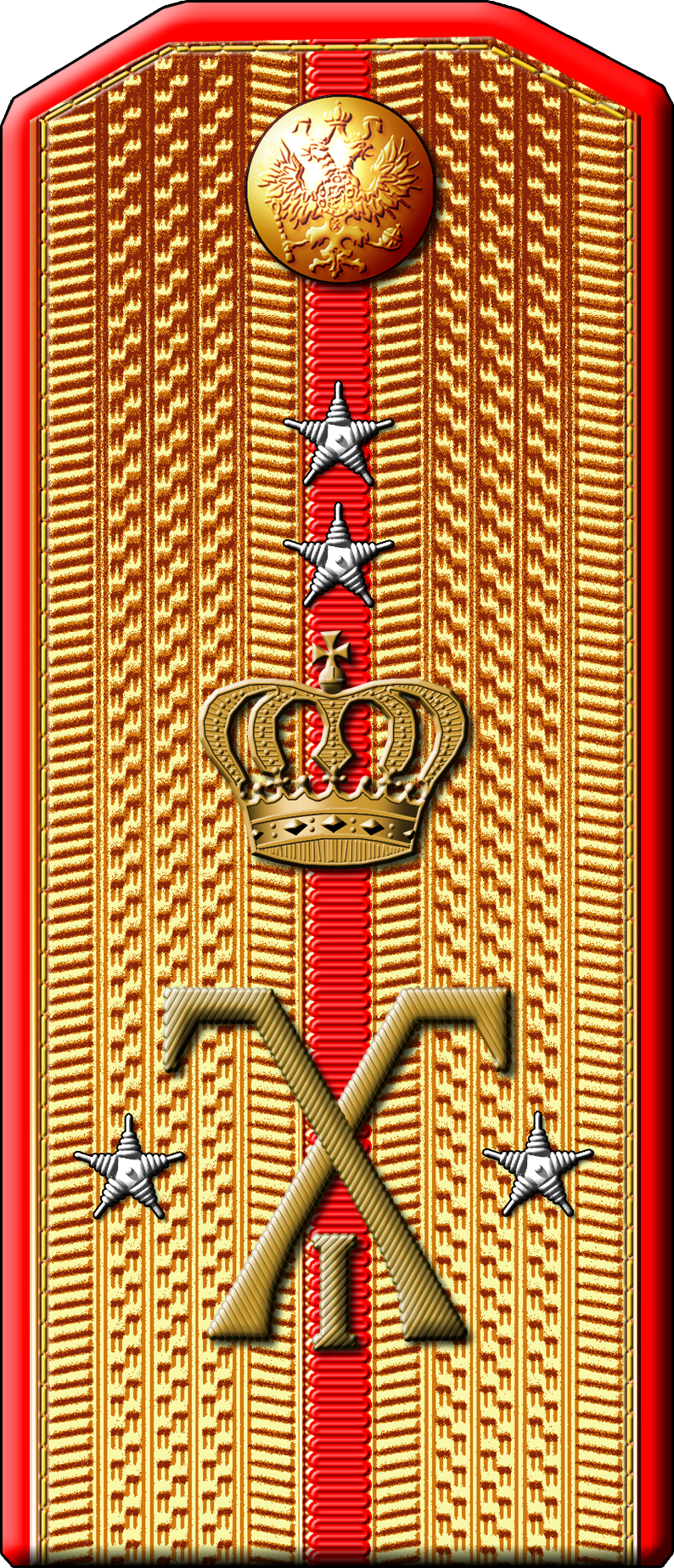
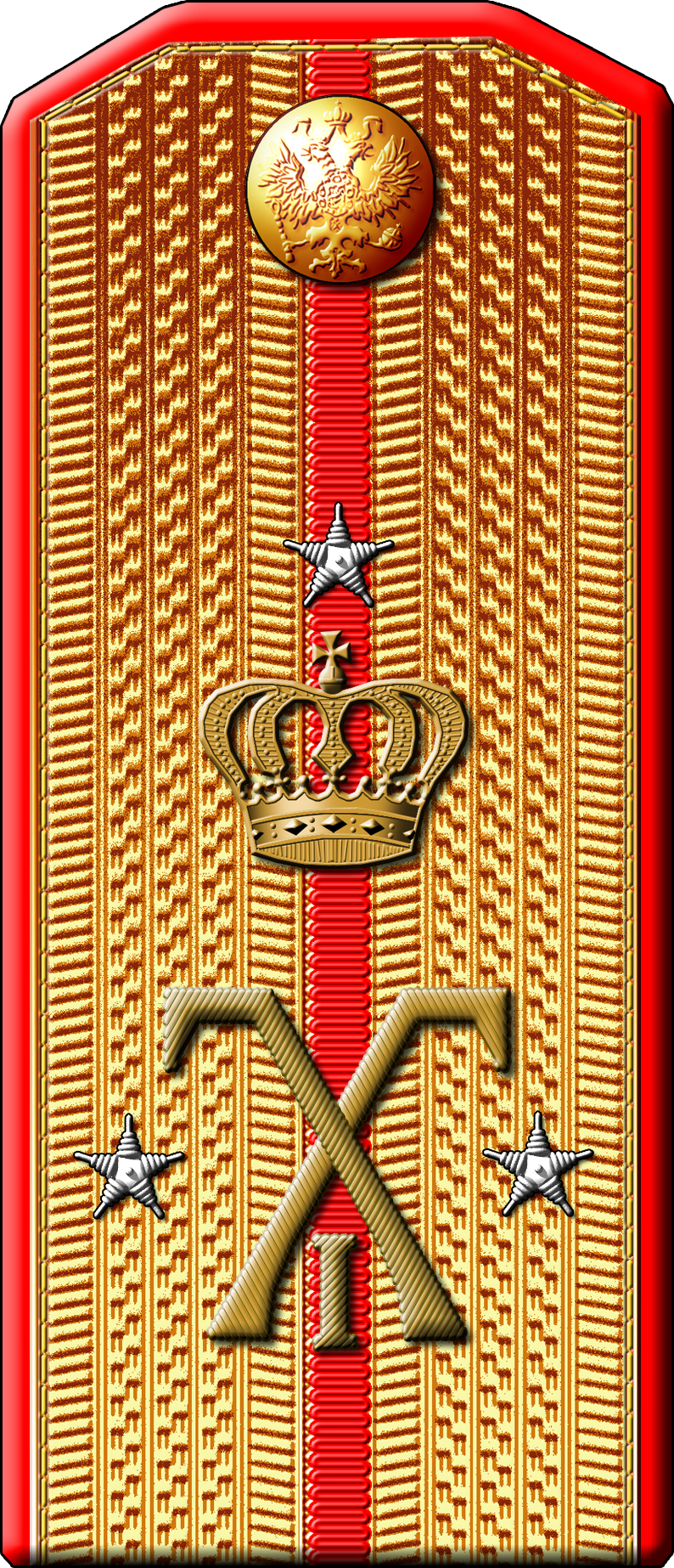
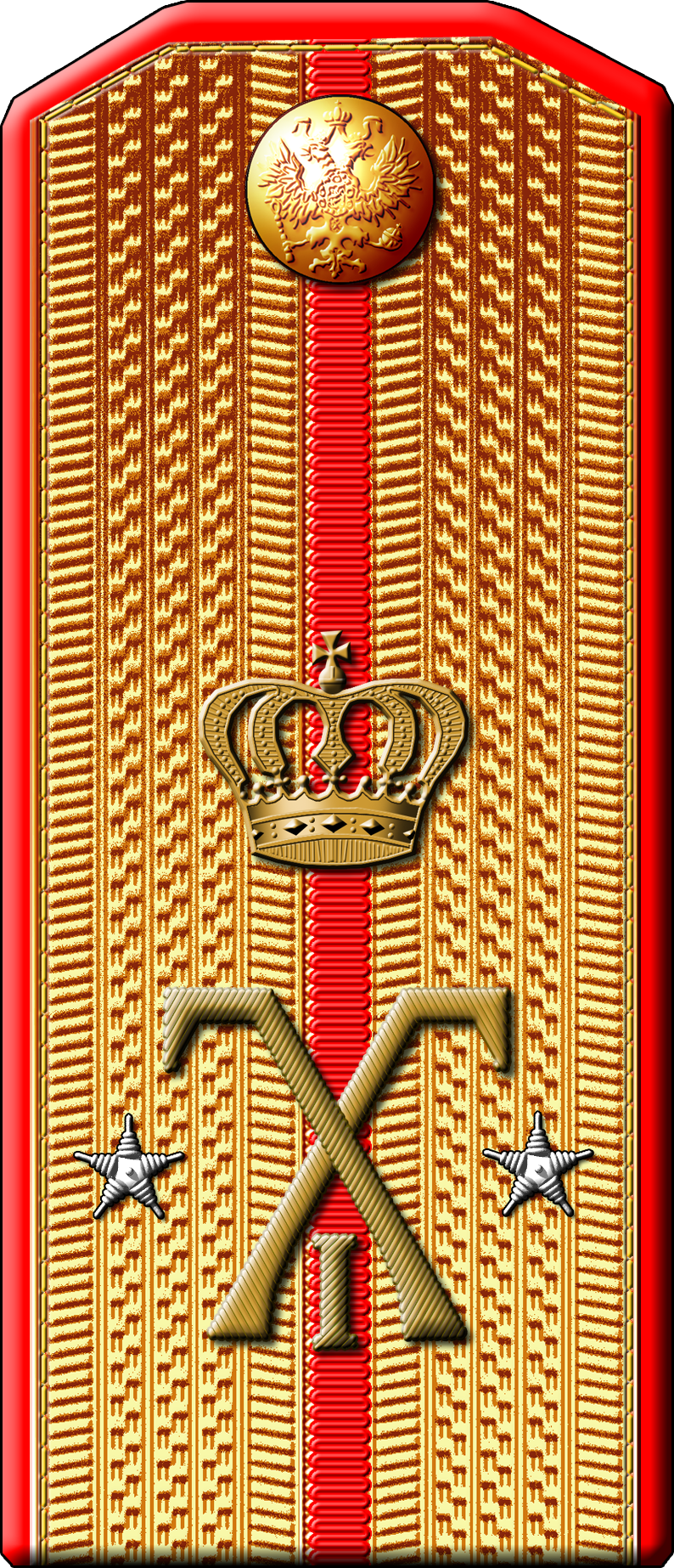
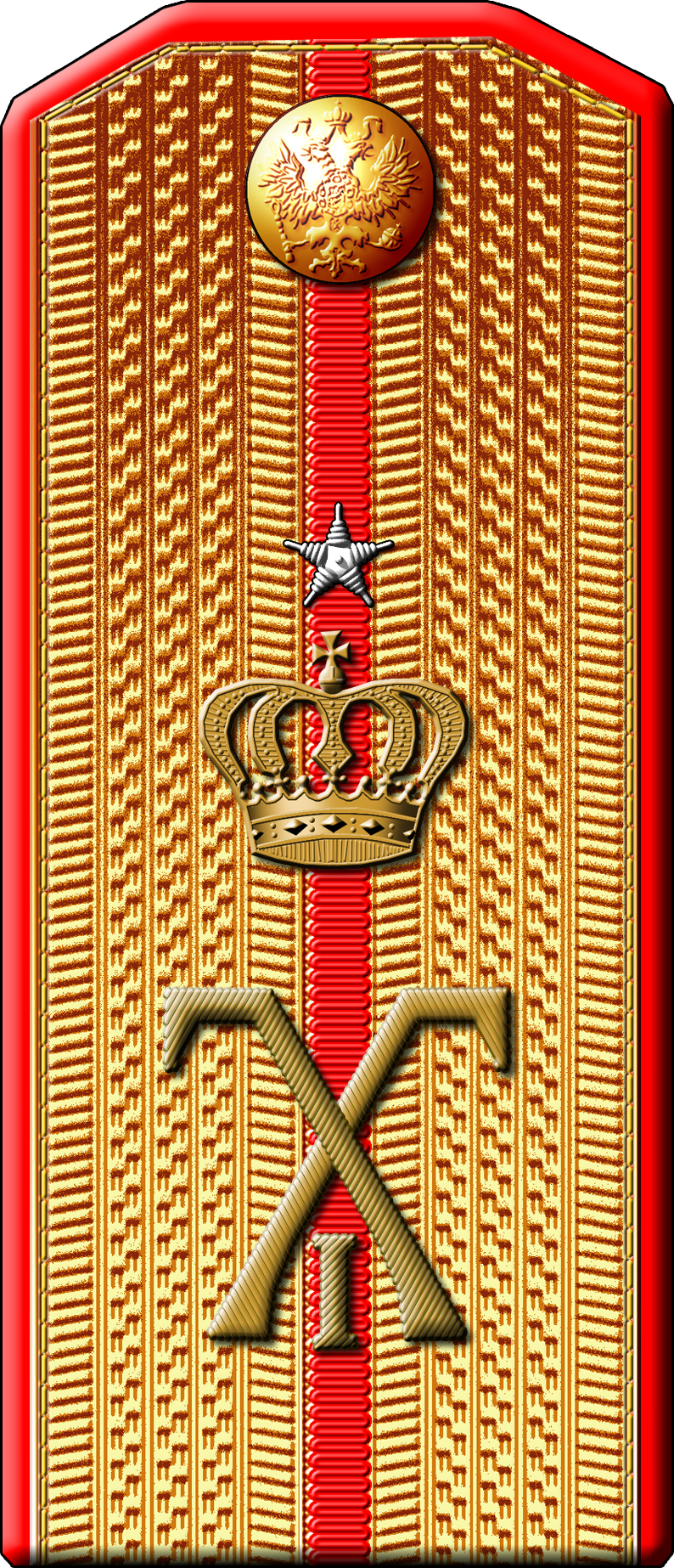
Label	Regimental rank insignia of the 1st Neva Infantry Regiment as of 1911
Shoulder board
Rank designation	Polkovnik (en: colonel)	Podpolkovnik (lieutenant colonel)	Mayor (major)	Kapitan (captain)	Stabs-kapitan	Poruchik	Podporuchik	Praporshchik
Rank group	Shtab-ofitsery (en: staff officers)				Ober-ofitsery (en: upper, superior, or higher officers)

=== NCOs and enlisted ===
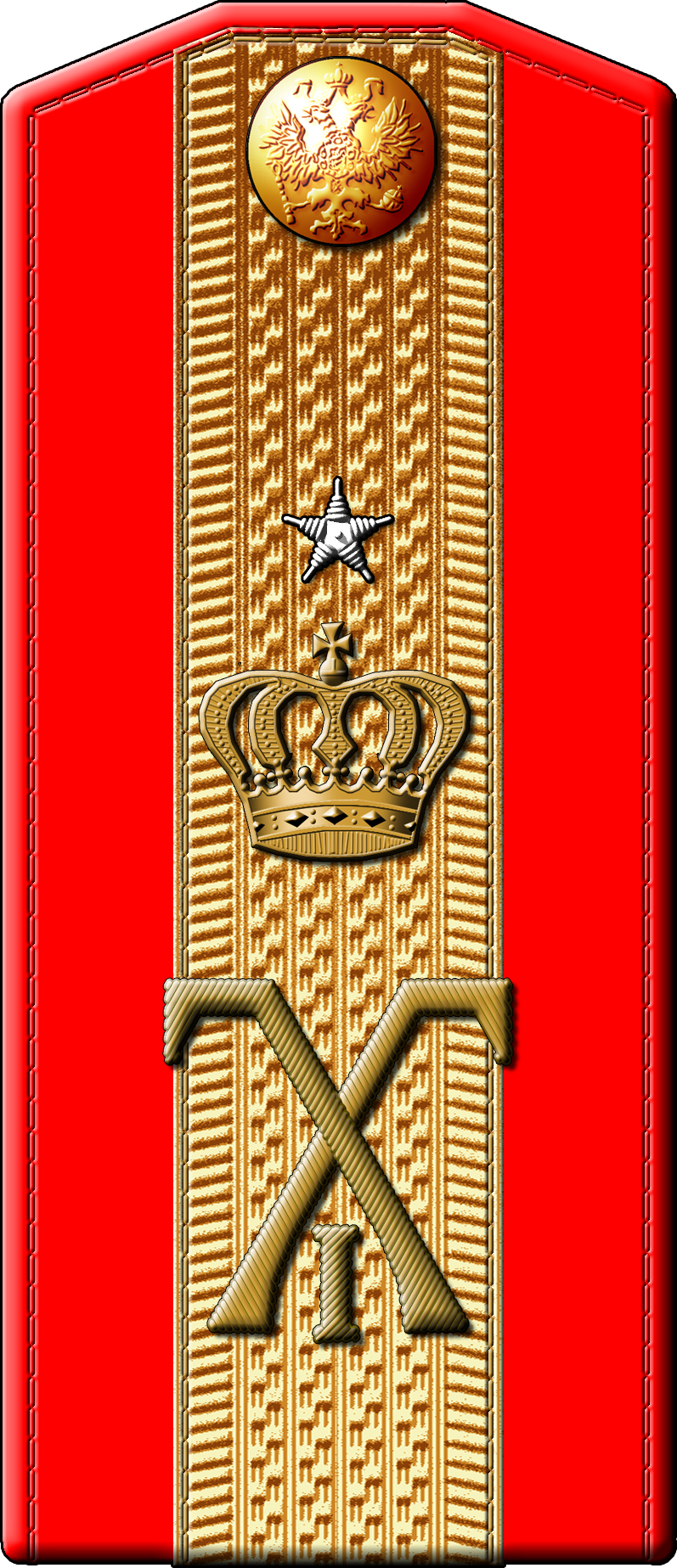
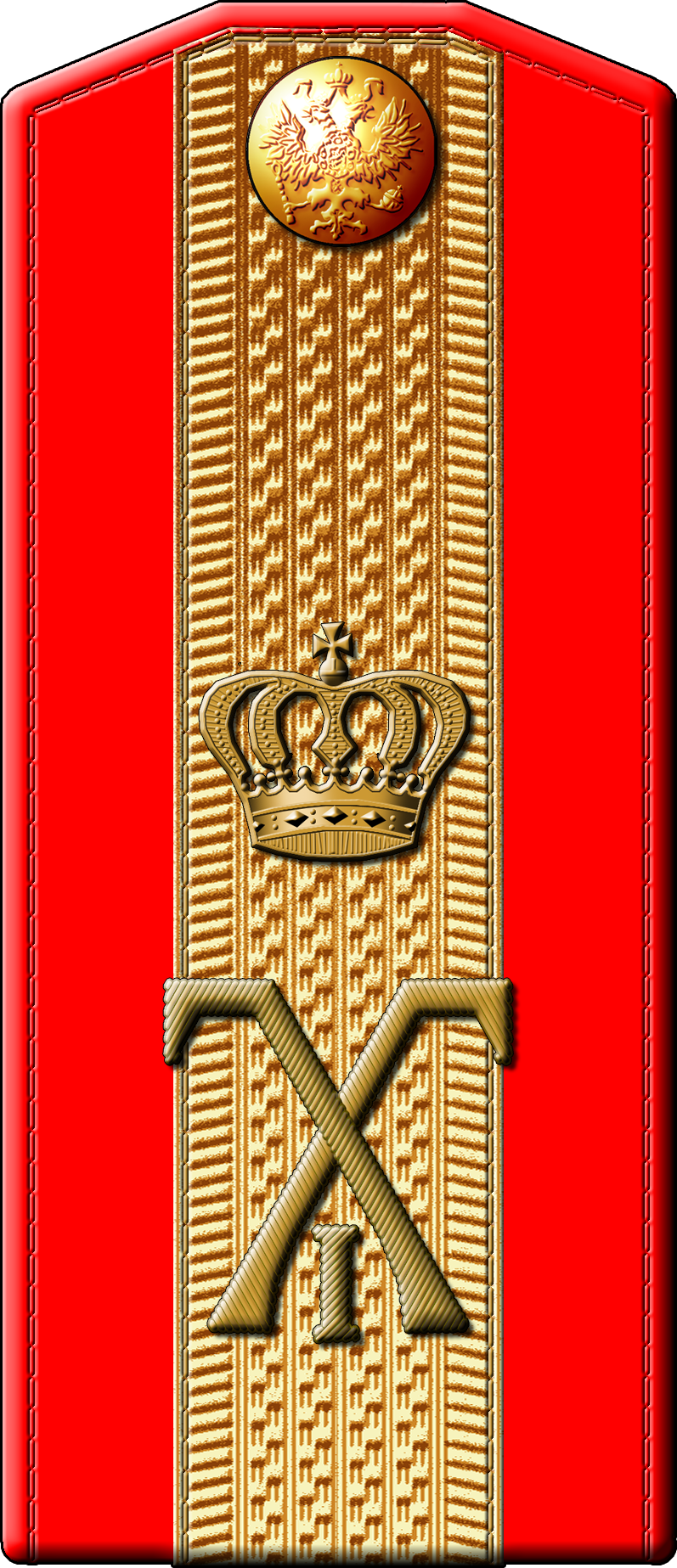
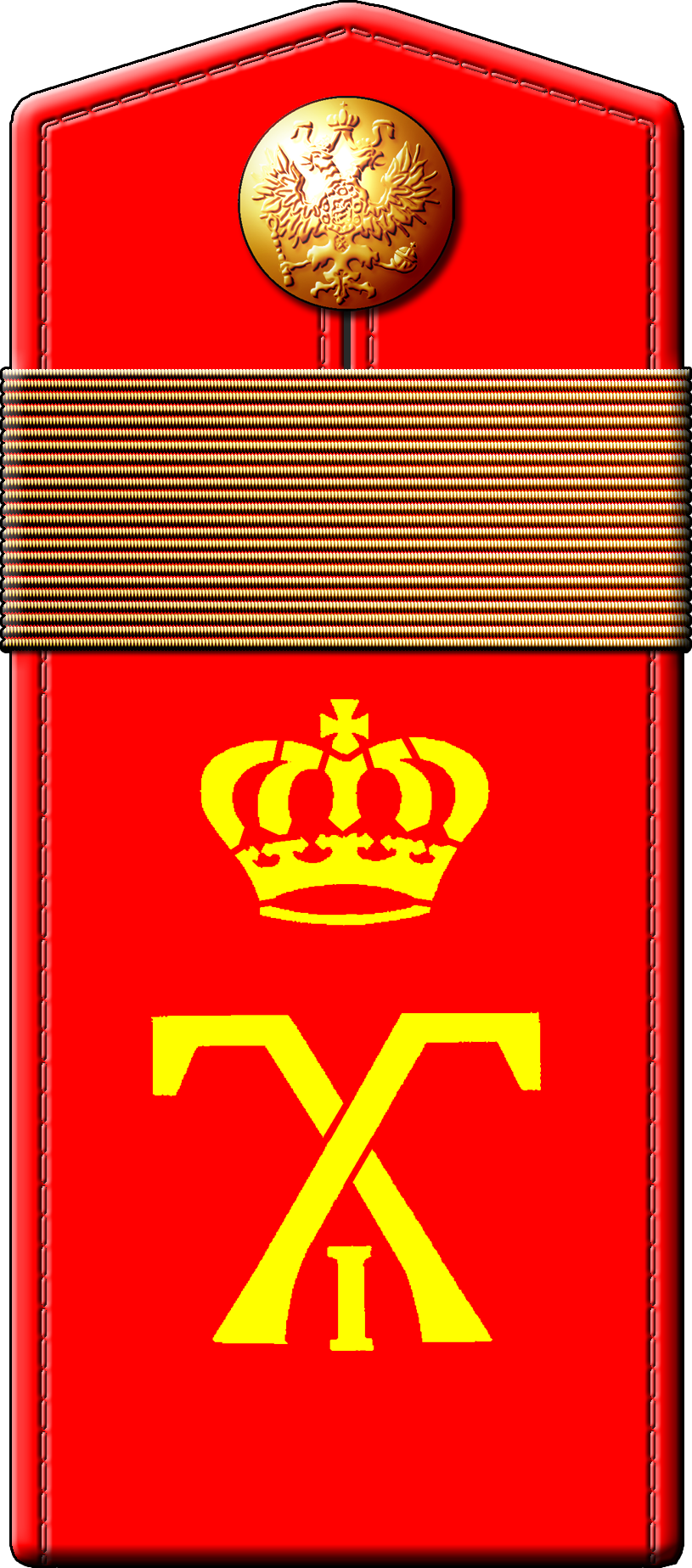
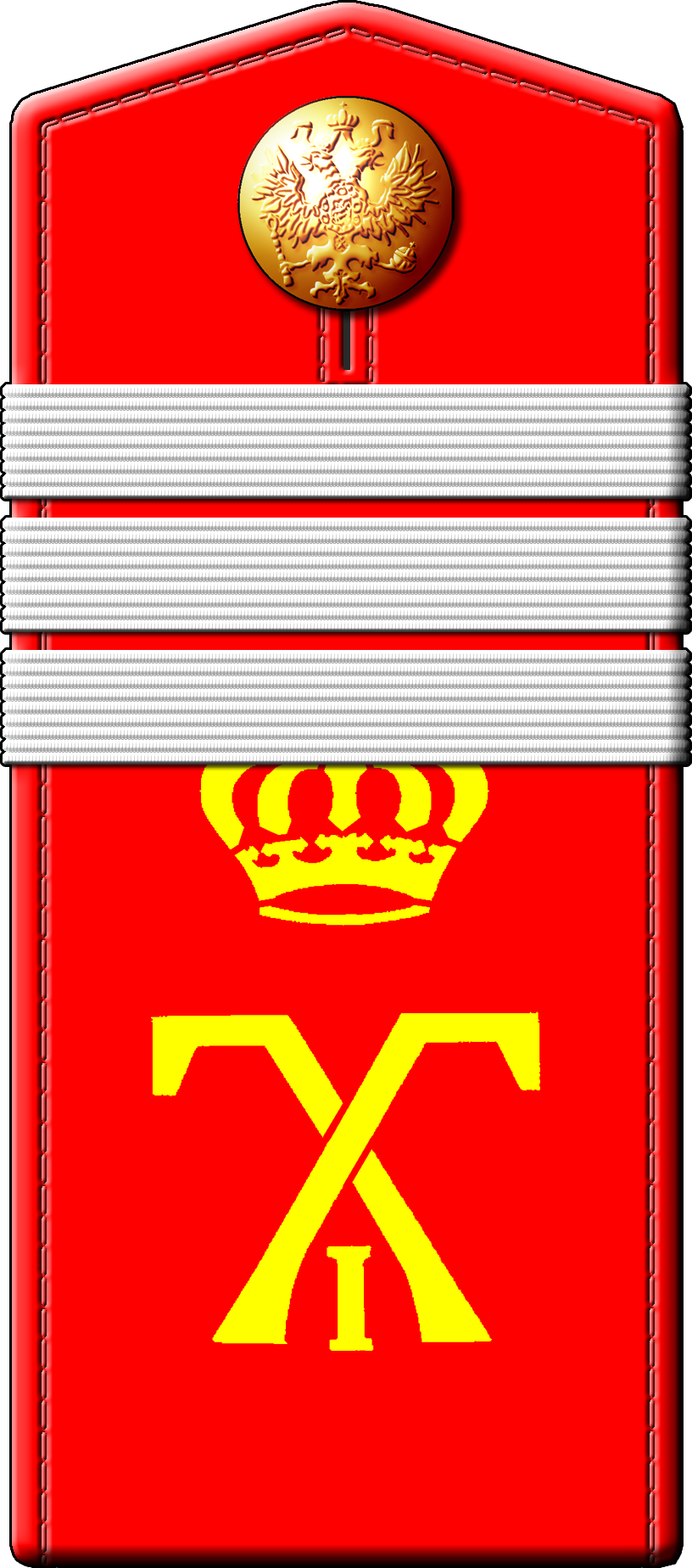
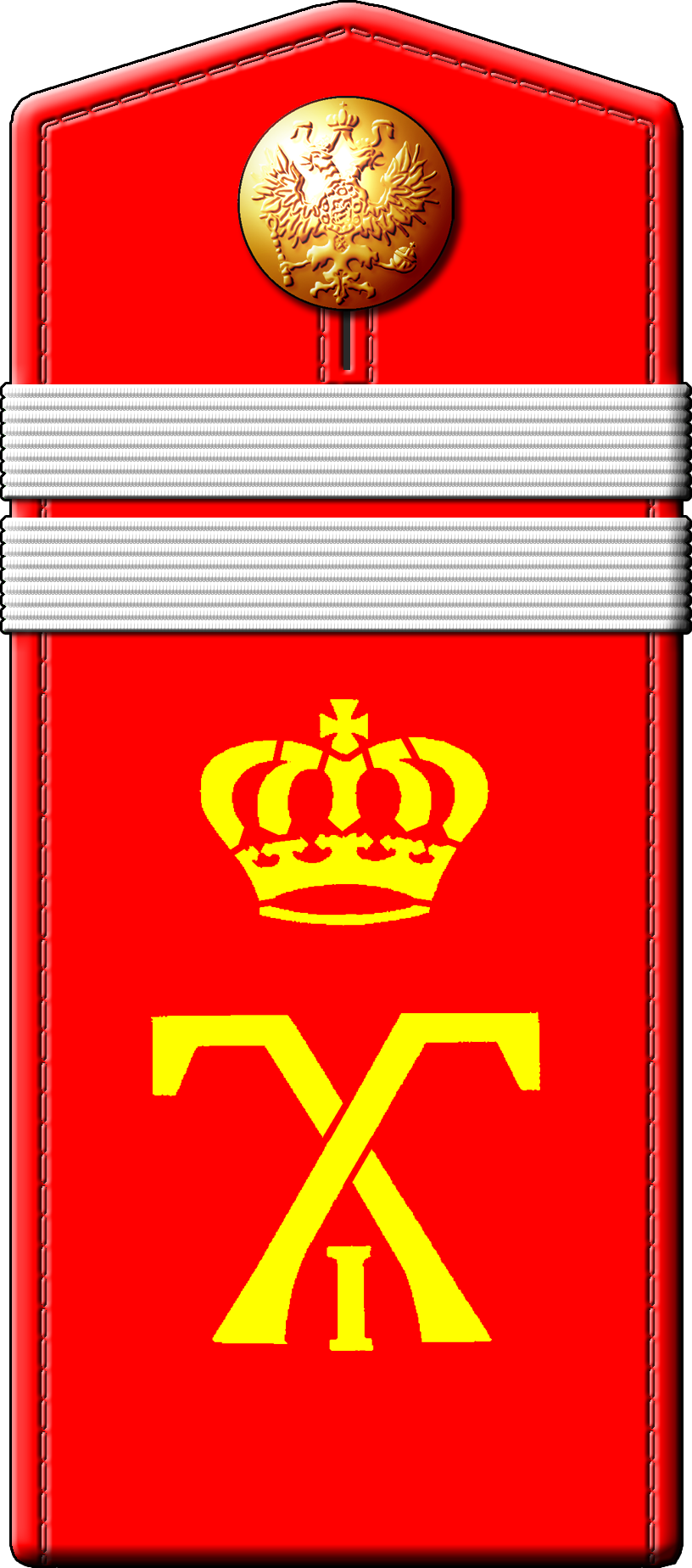
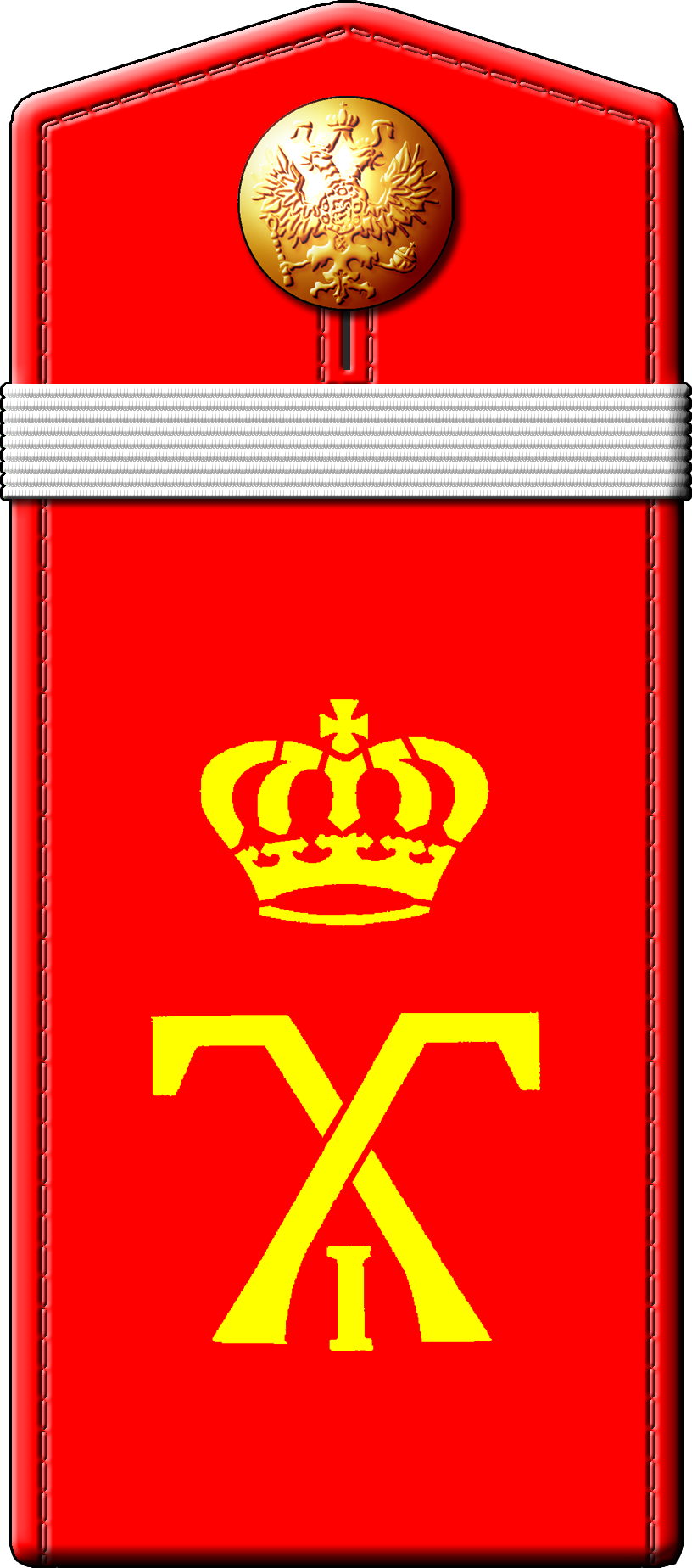
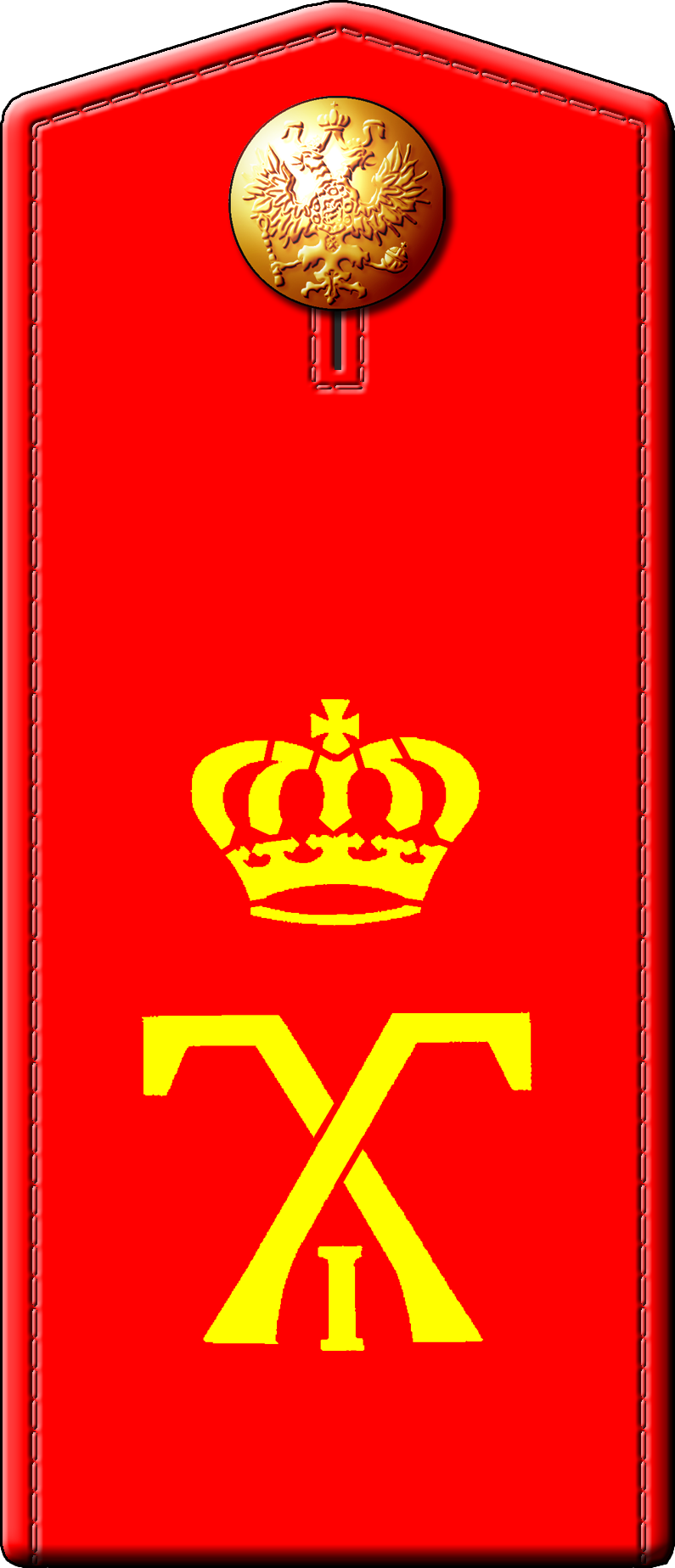
Label	Regimental rank insignia of the 1st Neva Infantry Regiment as of 1911
Shoulder board
Rank designation	Zauryad-praporshchik	Podpraporshchik	Feldfebel	Starshy unter-оfitser (en: senior NCO)	Мladshy unter-оfitser (en: junior NCO)	Yefeytor (en: Private first class)	Ryadovoy (en: Private)
Rank group	Unter-ofitsery (en: Non-commissioned officers)					Ryadovye (en: enlisted men)

== See also ==
- List of Imperial Russian Army formations and units
