= Alexander von Taube =

Russian and Soviet general (1864–1919)

Alexander Alexandrovich von Taube
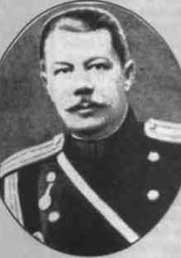
- Born: 21 August 1864; Pavlovsk, Saint Petersburg Governorate, Russian Empire
- Died: January 1919 (aged 54); Yekaterinburg, Provisional All-Russian Government
- Military career
- Allegiance: Russian Empire; Russian Soviet Federative Socialist Republic
- Branch: Imperial Russian Army
- Rank: lieutenant general
- Conflicts: Russo-Japanese War; World War I Russian Civil War

Baron Alexander Alexandrovich von Taube (21 August 1864 – January 1919) was an Imperial Russian general.

He fought in the war of Russia against the Empire of Japan. In WWI, major general, later as lieutenant general, commanded the 5th Siberian Infantry Division. After the 1916 democratic revolution in Russia, he was elected by the soldiers' council to lead the Omsk (Siberia) military district.

In 1918, he was conscripted as a military specialist to serve in the Red Army. His service with the Red Army, during 1918, involved planning strategic operations in Siberia. During that time, the Red Army in Siberia was defeated by the Volunteer Army of Admiral Alexander Kolchak. General Taube was detained on the territory controlled by the Volunteer Army. Being taken to Yekaterinburg, at that time one of the centers of the White movement) he was investigated, offered service with the Volunteer Army; however, while still in detention, he died of typhus.

Many years later, Soviet historians described him as the first Red General; while it is well known that the Soldiers Council Soviets in Siberia were under the control of Social Revolutionary Party, who were independent of the Moscow Bolsheviks. Only after the establishment of the Red Bolshevik rule in part of Siberia in 1918, he was conscripted to serve in the Red Army as a "military specialist". And at the same time, his younger children, two sons and a daughter, were kept as hostages in Moscow. General's oldest son, Staff Captain Alexander Taube, was serving in the "White", Admiral Alexander Kolchak Volunteer Army.

General Taube was born in Pavlovsk, Saint Petersburg. He had several brothers, including Mikhail Taube. He was a recipient of the Imperial Russian decorations: Order of Saint Vladimir, the Order of Saint Anna, the Order of Saint Stanislaus (House of Romanov), and the Gold Sword for Bravery.

Preceded by	Chief of Staff of the 1st Infantry Division; 1901–1904	Succeeded by

== Bibliography ==
- Их именами названы улицы Омска. Омск. 1988.
- Сибирский красный генерал. В. С. Познанский. Новосибирск, 1972 (2-е изд. — 1978). A Soviet, following communist party line book, being published in the USSR.
- Таубе Александр Александрович. Вибе П. П., Михеев А. П., Пугачёва Н. М. Омский историко-краеведческий словарь. Москва. 1994.

== Sources ==
- Энциклопедия Омска: Омск в лицах
- Биография на сайте Хронос
- "Alexander von Taube" (in Russian). «Russian army in a Great war» project.
