= Dobruja campaign =

1916 battle of World War I

- Part of the Romanian Campaign (1916)
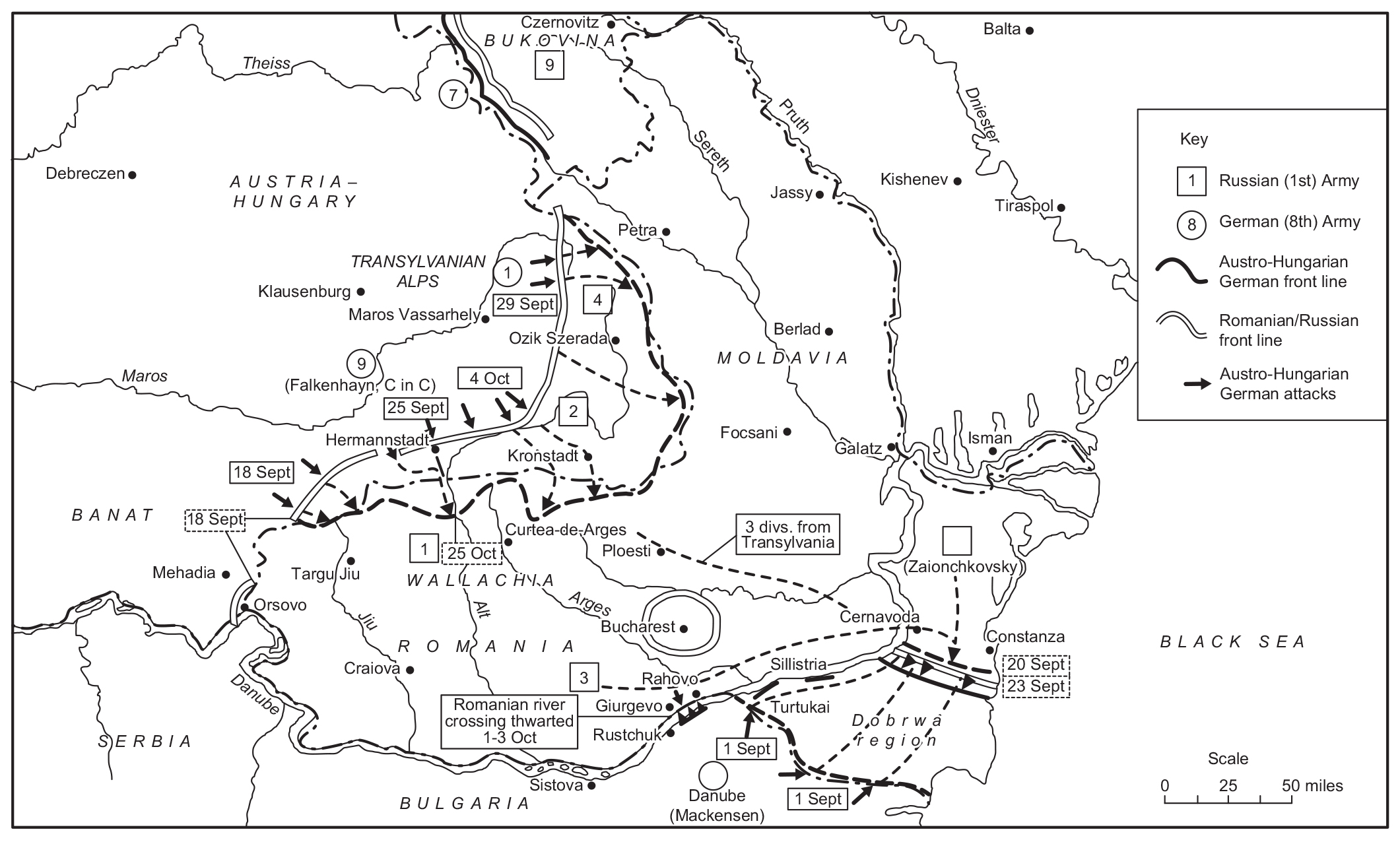
- Map of the Romanian campaign of 1916.
Date	2 September – 25 October 1916
Location	Dobruja, Romania
Result	Central Powers victory

Belligerents
Central Powers: Bulgaria; Germany; Ottoman Empire	Allied Powers: Romania; Russian Empire

Commanders and leaders
(Tsardom of Bulgaria (1908–1946)) Stefan Toshev (Tsardom of Bulgaria (1908–1946)) Todor Kantardzhiev (Tsardom of Bulgaria (1908–1946)) Ivan Kolev (Tsardom of Bulgaria (1908–1946)) Panteley Kiselov (German Empire) August von Mackensen (Ottoman Empire) Mustafa Hilmi Pasha	(Kingdom of Romania) Alexandru Averescu (Kingdom of Romania) Mihail Aslan (Kingdom of Romania) Constantin Teodorescu; Andrei Zayonchkovski

Strength
Battle of Turtucaia: 31 battalions: 55,000; Battle of Bazargic: 23 battalions 10 artillery batteries 17 cavalry squadrons First Battle of Cobadin: 62 battalions and 27 squadrons Second Battle of Cobadin: 96 battalions and 28 squadrons: 71,581+ riflemen	Battle of Turtucaia: 19 battalions (initially): 39,000; 36 battalions (end phase); 4 river monitors 8 gunboats Battle of Bazargic: 46 battalions 17 artillery batteries 19 cavalry squadrons First Battle of Cobadin: 70+ battalions and 41 squadrons: 4 river monitors Second Battle of Cobadin: 116 battalions and 40 squadrons

Casualties and losses
Unknown, heavy	Unknown, heavy

The Dobruja campaign was a major operation during the Romanian campaign of World War I. It took place between 2 September and 25 October 1916 between a joint Bulgarian–German–Ottoman force, consisting mainly of the Bulgarian Third Army, and a Romanian–Russian force. The battle was part of the Romanian campaign towards the end of 1916. It ended with a Central Powers victory.

== Background ==
By August 1916 the Central Powers found themselves in an increasingly difficult military situation – in the West the German offensive at Verdun had turned into a costly battle of attrition, in the East the Brusilov Offensive was crippling the Austro-Hungarian Army, and in the South the Italian Army was increasing the pressure on the Austro-Hungarians, while General Maurice Sarrail's Allied expeditionary force in northern Greece seemed poised for a major offensive against the Bulgarian Army.

The Romanian government asserted that the moment was right for it to fulfill the country's national ambitions by aligning itself with the Entente, and declared war on the Austro-Hungarian Empire on 27 August 1916. Three Romanian armies invaded Transylvania through the Carpathian Mountains, pushing back the much smaller Austro-Hungarian First Army. In a short time the Romanian forces occupied Orșova, Petroșani, and Brașov, and reached Sibiu on their way to the river Mureș, the main objective of the offensive.

In response the German Empire declared war on the Kingdom of Romania on 27 August, with the Kingdom of Bulgaria following suit on 1 September. On the next day the Bulgarian Third Army initiated the Central Powers' first major offensive of the campaign by invading Southern Dobruja.

== Battle ==
=== Turtucaia ===
The Battle of Turtucaia was very important due to its consequences. As for the southern front (on the Romanian–Bulgarian border), it allowed the Bulgarian-German troops to attack Dobrogea (which they later occupied). Much more serious was the fact that on the northern front (from Transylvania) the offensive carried out by the Romanian troops against the German and Austro-Hungarian troops was stopped, seven divisions being taken from this sector and transferred to the southern front. Even if later six of them returned to the northern front, the halting of the offensive in Transylvania allowed, on the one hand, the concentration of German and Austro-Hungarian troops, which were able to launch an offensive that resulted in pushing the Romanian troops to the Carpathian line, and, on the other hand, later allowed the invasion of Muntenia.

=== Bazargic ===
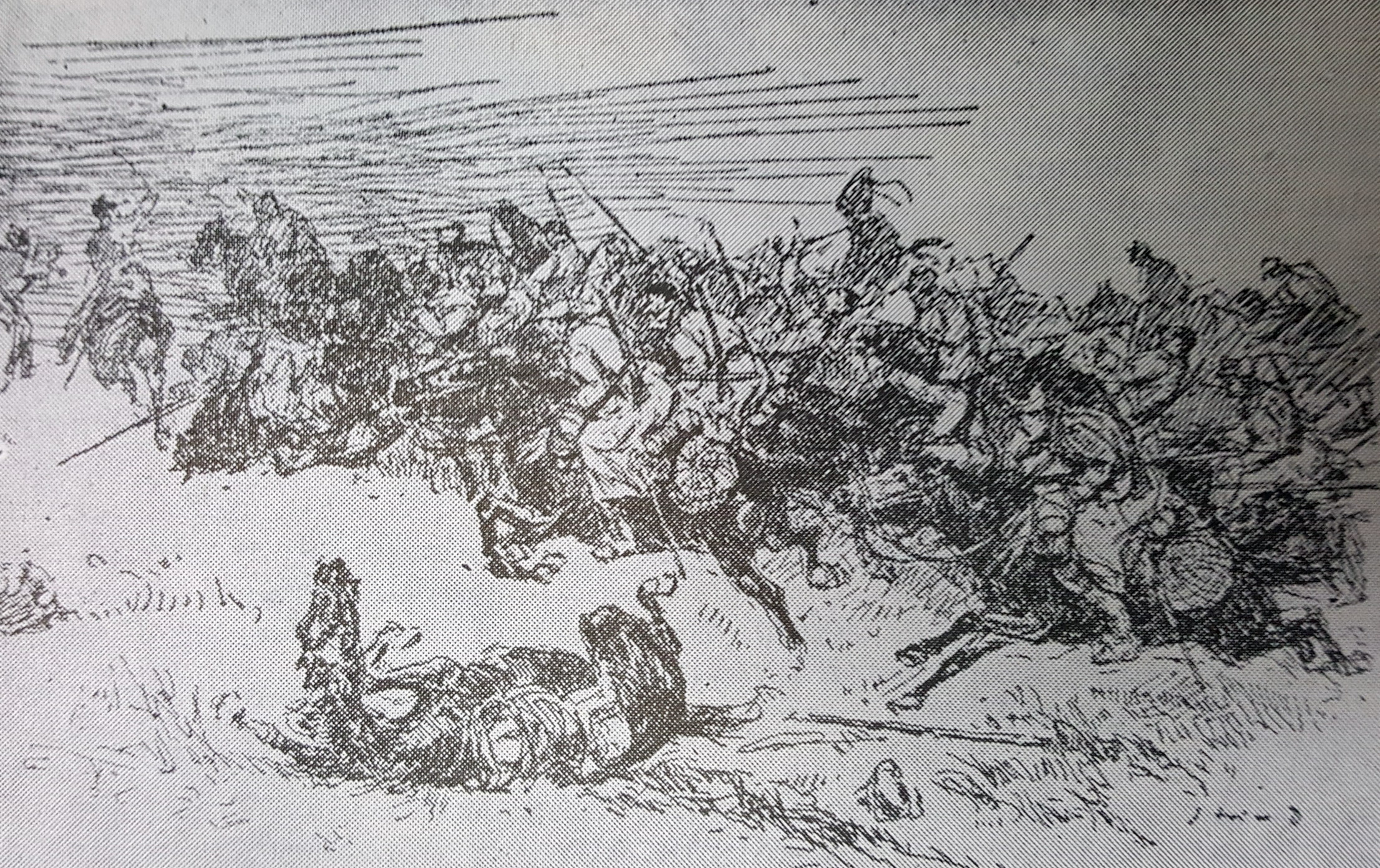
Romanian cavalry charge during the battle of Bazargic

Simultaneously with the assault of the fortress of Turtucaia, the Bulgarian Third Army defeated the Romanian-Russian force, including the First Serbian Volunteer Division, at the Battle of Bazargic, despite their numerical superiority. The outnumbered forces of the Central Powers managed to push the Romanians and the Russians north, while the Serbian Volunteer division suffered heavy casualties with 8,539 dead and wounded.

On 7 September after intense fighting the defeated Russian general ordered a withdrawal.

=== Cobadin I ===
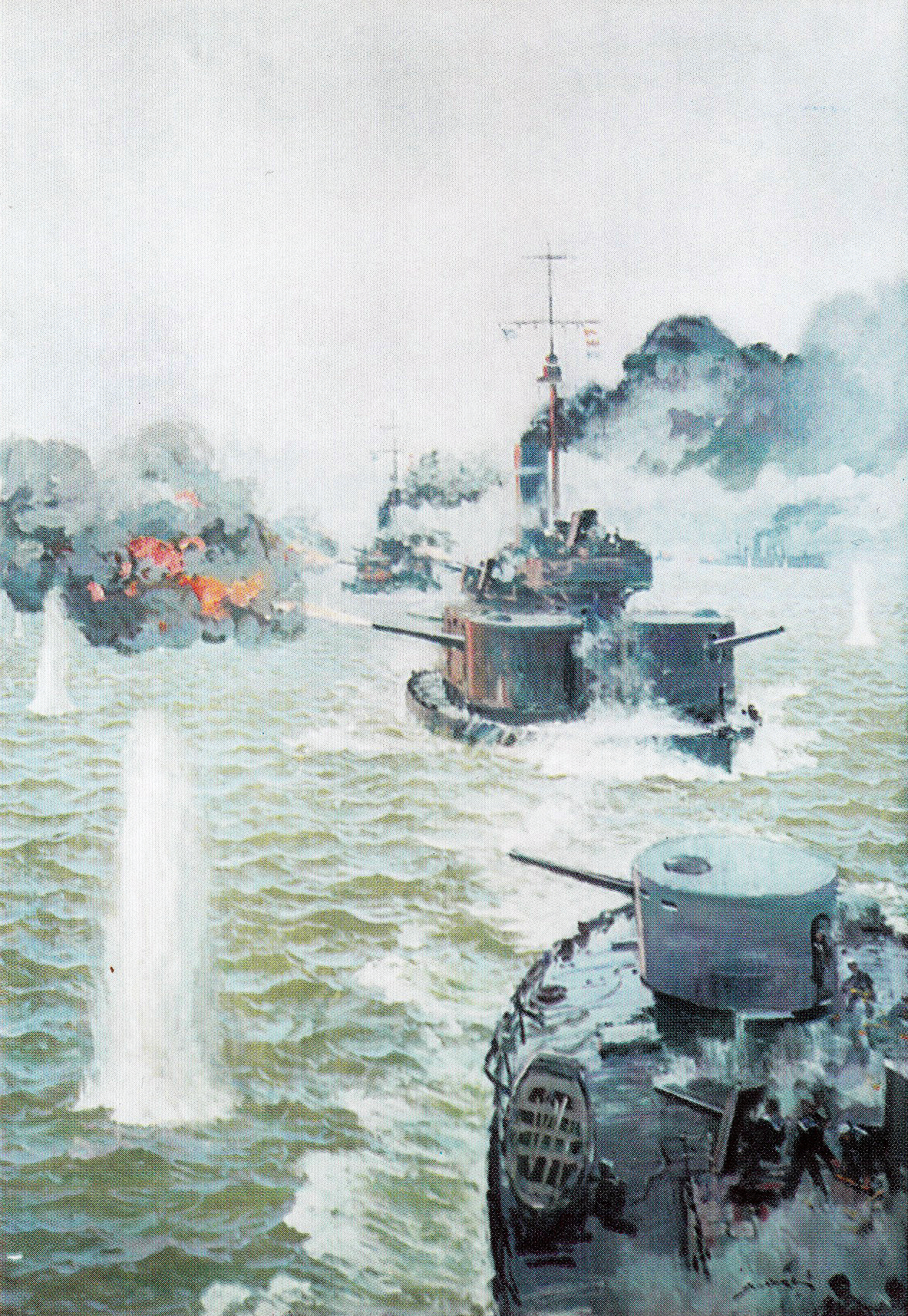
The Romanian river monitors at Rasova

The First Battle of Cobadin was a battle fought from 17 to 19 of September 1916 between the Bulgarian Third Army and the Romanian–Russian Army of the Dobruja. The battle ended in Entente tactical victory and forced the Central Powers to hold their offensive and assume a defensive stance till the middle of October.

The right flank of the Allied forces was supported by the Romanian Navy's Danube Flotilla, consisting mainly of four Brătianu-class river monitors. These warships blocked with mines the river sectors of Silistra, Ostrov, and Gura Borcea, protected the 8 September evacuation of Silistra, attacked enemy land convoys, and destroyed enemy batteries.

=== Amzacea ===
The Battle of Amzacea was a military engagement fought between Allied (Romanian and Russian) and Central Powers (Turkish and Bulgarian) forces. The Romanian 19th Infantry Division on 3 October defeated the 25th Turkish Division and captured Amzacea after a bayonet charge. But Amzacea was lost once more in consequence of the 12th and 15th Romanian Divisions being transferred to the north. The region was evacuated shortly thereafter, with the Russo-Romanian troops subsequently retreating to their original lines.

=== Cobadin II ===
The Second Battle of Cobadin was a battle fought from 19 to 25 October 1916 between the Central Powers, chiefly the Bulgarian Third Army, and the Entente, represented by the Russo–Romanian Dobruja Army. The battle ended in a decisive victory for the Central Powers; it resulted in the occupation of the strategic port of Constanța and the capture of the railway between that city and Cernavodă.

== Aftermath ==
Despite the loss of most of Dobruja to the Central Powers, the Romanian defensive victory at Tulcea in January 1917, combined with the actions of the Romanian cruiser Elisabeta at the mouths of the Danube, ensured Romanian control over the entire Danube Delta throughout the rest of the War.

== Sources ==
- Ivo Banac (2015). The National Question in Yugoslavia: Origins, History, Politics. Cornell University Press. ISBN 978-1-5017-0193-1.
- Richard C. Hall (2010). Balkan Breakthrough: The Battle of Dobro Pole 1918. Indiana University Press. ISBN 978-0-253-00411-6.
