= Third Army (Bulgaria) =

Трета армия
- Active: 1912–1913; 1915–1918; 1941–1945; 1951–2006
- Country: Bulgaria
- Allegiance: Bulgarian Army
- Type: Field Army
- Engagements: Balkan Wars: Battle of Kirk Kilisse; Battle of Lule Burgas; Chataldzha Line; World War I: Romanian Campaign; Battle of Tutrakan; Battle of Dobrich; First and Second Cobadin; World War II

Commanders
- Notable commanders: Radko Dimitriev; Stefan Toshev

The Bulgarian Third Army was a Bulgarian field army during the Balkan Wars, World War I, and World War II.

== Balkan Wars ==
Following the peace in 1907, Bulgaria's territory was divided into three army inspectorates, each comprising three divisional districts. During war they formed three independent field armies. The Third Army Inspectorate, which had its seat in Ruse, formed the headquarters of the Third Army.

On 17 September 1912 Tsar Ferdinand signed a special decree ordering the mobilization of the Bulgarian armed forces, and in accordance with the constitution of the country assumed the nominal role of commander-in-chief. The three Bulgarian field armies were activated and began concentrating on the border with the Ottoman Empire. The Third Army was placed under the command of Lieutenant General Radko Dimitriev and his chief of staff, Colonel Konstantin Zhostov.

=== First Balkan War ===
The chief of staff of the Bulgarian Army, Major General Ivan Fichev, had devised the final plan for the war with the Ottoman Empire more than a year earlier. He realized that Bulgaria had to seize the initiative immediately after the outbreak of the war by conducting a large offensive in Eastern Thrace. To achieve this task the general deployed all three Bulgarian field armies in the vicinity of the Thracian border. The Third Army had a special role in the plan as it was deployed to the northeast of the First Army and its concentration in that area was concealed by the Cavalry Division. General Fichev expected that the Ottomans would remain unaware of this important force and General Dimitriev would shatter the right wing of the unsuspecting Eastern Army. On 4 October O.S. the Third Army had the following composition:

Third Army Order of Battle
	Battalions	Men	Rifles	Machine guns	Cannons
Army Staff and Services		1,295	356		
Fourth Preslav Infantry Division	25	36,551	25,524	24	72
Fifth Danube Infantry Division	25	30,892	22,046	24	70
Sixth Bdin Infantry Division	17	23,637	17,571	16	36
Eight Cavalry Regiment		462	328		
Army Units		2,642	430		42
Total	67	95,479	66,255	64	220

General Dimitriev, Colonel Zhostov and other staff officers during the campaign.

On 5 October, Bulgaria declared war on the Ottoman Empire and its field armies began their advance against the Eastern Army which was still mobilizing. By 8 October the Third Army had moved south and managed to align its front with that of the First Army without being detected by the Ottomans, proving General Fitchev's expectations correct. The two Bulgarian armies were now ready to commence the attack on the Adrianople – Kirk Kilisse line.

The commander of the Ottoman Army Kölemen Abdullah Pasha, under the pressure of his superiors, planned to attack the Bulgarians on their flanks and envelop them with his III Corps and the forces of the Adrianople fortress. The lack of sufficient information led him to greatly underestimate the strength of the invading armies and had grave consequences for the Ottomans.

On 9 October the Bulgarian high command ordered its Third Army, which formed the left flank of the invading forces, to capture Kirk Kilisse. This coincided with the beginning of the Ottoman offensive and the advance of the III Corps against the Bulgarian left. Its commander, Mahmoud Mohtar Pasha, expected weak resistance but instead his 23 infantry battalions were pitted against the 48 infantry battalions of the Bulgarian 4th and 5th divisions when the two forces collided at the villages of Petra, Eskipolos and Elekler. In the ensuing struggle, the Ottomans were overwhelmed and forced to retreat in panic which meant that the planned encirclement of the Bulgarians was impossible. The remaining Ottoman forces further west were also suffering defeats and the overall situation deteriorated rapidly. Abdullah Pasha ordered a general retreat and abandoned the Empire's most strategic defensive position on the Balkan Peninsula. In addition more than 60,000 Ottoman troops were surrounded in Adrianople and the Bulgarian Third Army took Kirk Kilisse on 11 October.

With the end of the Battle of Kirk Kilisse battle the Bulgarian high command chose to rest its forces instead of vigorously pursuing the retreating Ottomans. The Ottomans used the time to establish a new defensive line. By the time the Bulgarian Third and First armies resumed their advance their opponents were thoroughly entrenched and reinforced. When the Battle of Lule Burgas began the Bulgarians were forced to engage in a direct frontal assault with around 108,000 riflemen against the 126,000 riflemen of the Ottomans. The Third Army was to bear the brunt of the fighting as the First Army was forced to leave substantial forces to guard its rear and right flank in the direction of Adrianople. Despite their numerical superiority the Ottoman armies were routed after a five-day battle. The nature of the battle however also caused heavy casualties to the Bulgarians, especially in the ranks of the heavily engaged Third Army which had some 15,561 men killed or wounded and 2,911 missing from its ranks. The losses and exhaustion of the soldiers again forced the Bulgarian command to order a couple of days rest.

When the Bulgarians continued the advance the Ottoman Army was entrenched at the last defensive line before Constantinople – the Chataldzha defensive line. The Bulgarian tsar as nominal commander-in-chief managed to impose his will over the Bulgarian high command in favor of an attack of the Ottoman positions, despite the objections to a rashly organized attack raised by General Ivan Fichev and the raging cholera in the armies. The opinion of General Mihail Savov (the de facto commander-in-chief) who viewed an immediate attack as a tactical and strategic necessity also supported Ferdinand's opinion.

Thus General Dimitriev, now in command of a sort of an army group that combined the Bulgarian First and Third armies, was tasked with the planning and execution of the attack on Chataldzha on 4 November and at least on paper could count on 175,000 men with 118,000 rifles against the Ottoman Army's 140,000 men and 103,000 rifles. In reality the available effectiveness on both sides was reduced by a raging cholera epidemic. General Dimitriev's recent experience however made him prone to underestimating the Ottoman Army and led him to commit only 14 regiments out of 38 in the attack; the rest he hoped to exploit after the Ottoman line was penetrated. This time however the Ottomans remained firm on almost all their positions and repelled all Bulgarian attack supported by their artillery which unlike the previous battles performed better than its Bulgarian counterpart. The result was a defeat and some 12,000 Bulgarian casualties, out of which some 8,451 were in the Third Army.

The First and Third Bulgarian armies remained at the Chataldzha line until the end of the war and managed to repel several Ottoman attempted breakthroughs in 1913.

=== Second Balkan War ===
Almost immediately after the end of the First Balkan War, Bulgaria began to transfer its forces from Eastern Thrace to Macedonia in order to protect its threatened interests in the area.

By the beginning of June, most of the Bulgarian Army was concentrated on the main theater of operations in Vardar and Aegean Macedonia, against the Serbian and Greek armies. The Bulgarian high command placed its First and Third armies along the old Serbian border. As this area was viewed as a secondary theater of operations, the strength of both armies was reduced significantly. The Third Army was now in fact one of the smallest field armies and had the following composition:

Third Army Order of Battle
	Battalions	Batteries	Squadrons	Men	Rifles	Cannons
First Sofia Infantry Division	16	12		26,931	16,560	60
Thirteenth Infantry Division	12	6		14,517	12,527	60
3/5 Infantry Brigade	8	7		?	?	?
Cavalry Division		1	13	1,745		
Army troops			4			
Total	36	30	17	43,906	29,087	120

Initially, the army had only one objective – to protect the capital Sofia. When the war began on 16 June, it and its neighboring 1st Army remained passive and even served as a source of reinforcements. So when the Bulgarian advance against the Serbians stalled, General Dimitriev was ordered to dispatch the 3/5 Infantry Brigade (45th and 46th Infantry regiments) to reinforce the 5th Army. In exchange, he was promised the 1st Army's 2/5 Infantry Brigade. On 20 June, General Mihail Savov was replaced by General Dimitriev as deputy commander-in-chief and the 3rd Army was placed under the command of General Racho Petrov. By that time, the Bulgarian command finally decided to utilize the inactive 1st and 3rd Armies and gave them orders to take the Serbian town of Knjaževac and then with their combined force to seize the fortress of Pirot.

The force facing the Bulgarian 3rd Army was the Serbian 2nd Army – a total of around 35 battalions, 13 batteries and three squadrons, many of whom were third-line troops. The Serbian defense was centered around the important road and railway junction of Pirot.

The Bulgarian 3rd Army was ordered to attack and pin down as many Serbian troops as possible while the 1st Army completed its primary objective in the north and then turned south to encircle Pirot. In order to achieve this task, General Petrov, following the orders of General Dimitriev, divided his forces into two groups. The Right Group that consisted of the 13th Infantry Division and 1/1 Infantry Brigade was to attack Pirot while the Left Group (also known as Tran Detachment), that was formed by the 2/1 Infantry Brigade, 2/5 Infantry Brigade, the Cavalry Division and the 46th Regiment, was to advance in the direction of Vranje. Due to the distance between the two groups, the forces operated independently. The only link between them was a single battalion supported by a cavalry squadron and two batteries.

The Left Group advanced first on 22 June. The bad weather, poor roads and fog hampered the speed of movement of the units and the strong Serbian positions prevented any important Bulgarian gains. On 5 July, the Group deployed around Tran with its 18 battalions, 2 squadrons and 11 batteries and was placed under the commander of the 5th Danube Division. The army headquarters ordered it to attack, penetrate the Serbian defensive line and cut the communication lines between Vranje and Niš. After several days of fighting, on 12 July the Bulgarians managed to dislodge the Serbians from their main defensive line at Bukova Glava and penetrate into Serbian territory but due to the exhaustion of attacking forces, the following attacks met with less success. The Serbian command was concerned with these developments and decided to reinforce its troop with units from Macedonia, which weakened their advance there and allowed the Bulgarian 4th Army to contain it. The Left Group of the 3rd Army however was ordered to retreat back to the border because it was considered needless to expose it to battle with the fresh Serbian reinforcements.

The advance of the Right Group began on 24 June; after a short struggle the Serbian vanguards were pushed back towards Pirot and the Bulgarians took up favorable positions on the high ground overlooking the field around the fortress from which their artillery could support any further attacks with great efficiency. On 30 July, the Group was ordered to dig in and repel the Serbian attacks, that had mainly reconnaissance purpose. On that day, however, the threat to the 1st Army's rear posed by the Romanian invasion of Northern Bulgaria led the Bulgarian high command to order the retreat of that army from Knjaževac, which it had recently occupied. This development made the planned capture of Pirot impossible and left the 3rd Army defending the positions it had so far won until the end of the war.

As stipulated by the Treaty of Bucharest (1913), the Bulgarian 3rd Army was demobilized on 29 July.

=== Commanders ===
- Lieutenant General Radko Dimitriev (17 September 1912 – 20 June 1913)
- Major General Racho Petrov (20 June 1913 – 10 August 1913)

== First World War ==
Two years after the end of the Second Balkan War Bulgaria entered World War I on the side of the Central Powers. General mobilization was declared on 9 September (23 September) with a special royal decree. In accordance the Third Army was activated on 12 September and was placed under the command of Lieutenant General Stefan Toshev and his chief of staff, Colonel Stefan Popov. On 15 September the general issued an order determining the order of battle as follows:

Third Army Order of Battle
	Battalions	Machine Gun Companies	Batteries	Cannons	Squadrons	Machine Gun Squadrons
Army Staff						
Fourth Preslav Infantry Division	17.5	4.5	17	74	9.5	2
Fifth Danube Infantry Division	23	6	17	78	1.5	
Vidin Fortified Area	4			31		
Ruse Fortified Area	4			24	1	
Shumen Fortified Area	4			35	1	
Varna Fortified Area	5.5	1.5	8	20		
Garrisons	16			23	1	
Army Units	8		8	26	5	1
Total	82	12	50	401	19	3

On 21 September Toshev received instructions from the chief of staff of the Bulgarian Army General Konstantin Zhostov to deploy his army for the defense of the Romanian border and the Black Sea coast in accordance with the high command's plan for war against Serbia and Greece. This task remained unchanged even after the declaration of war on Serbia and the advance of the Bulgaria First and Second armies during the subsequent Serbian Campaign.

Romania's neutrality during this period allowed the Bulgarian high command to use the Third Army as a reserve force for the operations in Macedonia and in the middle of 5 October, Danube Division was ordered to join the Second Army's operations against the Serbians and the Allied advance from Salonika. To compensate for this loss the command used the garrisons of Oryahovo, Gigen, Somovit, Nikopol and Svishtov as well as 2 March Brigade to form a new 12th Mixed Infantry Division. On 14 October a Russian fleet that included the battleships Imperatritsa Mariya, Evstafi, Ioann Zlatoust, Panteleimon, the cruisers Pamiat Merkuria and Kagul supported by eighteen smaller vessels bombarded the port of Varna. The force fired several hundred shells but came under the attack of German submarines 17 and 18 and retired by noon of the same day. The damage on the shore was light and only a few soldiers and some 27 civilians became casualties. After the attack the Army command took measures against a possible Russian landing in the vicinity of Varna – the coastal artillery was strengthened, new mines were laid in the sea and the Bulgarian high command made steps to acquire the navy's first submarine from the Germans that officially entered service in May 1916. Bulgarian morale was also raised by the arrival of the German 105th Infantry Division during November and in February 1916 the Bulgarian high command ordered the entire 1st Sofia Infantry Division to be transferred from Macedonia to Northern Bulgaria, where it arrived a month later.

The 11,287 men of the 105th Division formed the mobile forces of the army in the coastal areas and were ordered by General Toshev to defend the coast and repel any amphibious landings in the area of Varna and Burgas. For the next several months no such landing materialized and in May 1916 the Bulgarian and German high commands agreed to send the 105th Division to Macedonia with the exception of a single infantry battalion, two machine guns and the 105th heavy battery that were to remain in Shumen and Varna. Nevertheless, rumors that a Russian army was concentrating in the Crimea for a sea invasion of the Bulgarian coast in conjunction with an allied offensive in Macedonia continued to arrive in the Bulgarian high command headquarters. This and the first signs of the impending Romanian intervention in the war on the side of the Entente forced the command to reinforce the Third Army further during July and August with the 1st Cavalry division and the headquarters of the 6th Bdin Infantry Division together with one of its brigades. The defense of the Danube also became more important and in July a special German Danube Detachment of 3,019 men was formed up with Colonel von Kaufmann as its commander. This unit consisted of the German forces that were left in Varna and Shumen reinforced with the 6th Uhlan Regiment, the headquarters of the 7th Reserve Hussar Regiment with two squadrons, two mountain machine gun companies and a field battery from the 11th Army. In August the 115th Landwehr Regiment also arrived.

=== The Campaign in Dobrudja ===
Since the beginning of the First World War until the summer of 1916 the Central Powers had not considered any military response to a possible intervention of Romania on the side of the Allies and Austria-Hungary felt free to keep only small forces of soldiers and gendarmes in Transylvania. It was only in June 1916 that the headquarters of their high commands officially engaged in preliminary negotiations for combined military actions if the need arose. Then in July Field Marshal von Hötzendorf, General Falkenhayn and General Zhekov gathered at the German military headquarters in Pleß to finalize the talks and devise a general plan for the war. On 28 July they agreed on several measures – not to engage in unnecessary provocations against Romania, in case the country joined the Allies then Bulgaria was obliged to undertake offensive actions by all means and Austria-Hungary as far as the circumstances allowed. The Bulgarians were to advance in the Dobrudja capture the fortresses of Tutrakan and Silistra and then, with their right flank secured, prepare to cross the Danube and advance to Bucharest for which Austria-Hungary would commit its Danube Flotilla and bridge-building materials. Germany agreed to provide additional long range guns, airplanes and a zeppelin along with four or five infantry and one or two cavalry divisions for the front in Transylvania. In addition, von Falkenhayn was to reach an agreement with Enver Pasha on the deployment of Ottoman forces in Dobrudja.

In early August Austria-Hungary began concentrating larger forces in Transylvania as part of its First Army but still by the time Romania declared war on 27 August 1916 it could deploy only 50 battalions consisting of 1,058 officers and 33,302 riflemen who could rely on the support of 86 cannons and 10 squadrons .

Meanwhile, the German emperor and the Bulgarian tsar agreed to place all Central Powers forces in northern Bulgaria under the command of Field Marshal August von Mackensen, who at the time was commanding an army group on the Macedonian front. The appointment received the sanction of the Bulgarian commander-in-chief, General Zhekov, on 28 August and two days later the headquarters of Army Group Mackensen were established in Veliko Turnovo.

The field marshal's forces consisted in their greater part of the Bulgarian Third Army which had the following composition on 31 August:

Third Army Order of Battle
	Battalions	Machine Guns	Batteries	Cannons	Squadrons	Men	Rifles/Carbines
Army Staff and Services						6,800	1,919
Field Troops
First Sofia Infantry Division	23	37	17	66	1	40,541	24,700
Fourth Preslav Infantry Division	18	30	23	80	1	37,395	22,487
Sixth Bdin Infantry Division	9	12	6	21	1	15,912	10,293
First Cavalry Division	0.5	40	1	6	16	5,182	3,020
Fifth Cavalry Brigade		8			4	559	305
Total Field Troops	50.5	127	47	173	23	99,589	60,805
Local Troops
Varna Fortified Area	8	10	23	94	0.25	15,153	10,633
Shumen Fortified Area	4.25		9	28		953	
Ruse Fortified Area	7.75		13	52	1	9,325	8,902
Burgas Fortified Area	8.25	6	11	54		11,229	12,215
Total Local Troops	28.25	16	56	228	1.25	36,660	31,750
Defense of the Danube
Danube Detachment	4	2	7		6		
Twelfth Mixed Infantry Division	10.5	20	25		2		
Total Defense of the Danube	14.5	22	32		8		
Total Third Army	93.25	165	135	401	32.25	143,049	94,474

With Bulgarian resources stretched almost to their limits from Macedonia to Romania and German reserves now absorbed by the formation of the Ninth Army the Ottoman Empire alone could spare some additional troops for the strengthening of the Bulgarian Third Army. Thus in August the two infantry divisions (15th and 25th) of the VI Army Corps, with their 18 infantry battalions, 8 batteries (32 cannons) and 8 machine guns were given to Field Marshal Mackensen and prepared to be transported to Dobrudja.

In order to encourage Romania's entry into the war on 26 August Italy declared war on Germany and a day later Romania itself declared war but only on Austria-Hungary. The German Empire immediately answered with a war declaration and urged Bulgaria to do the same. The Bulgarian government however delayed its response and caused a great deal of concern in its allied high commands. The Austrians and Germans even initiated some small skirmishes with the Romanians along the Danube in order to compromise Bulgaria's neutrality but after Bulgarian protests they were discontinued. Finally, on 1 September, Tsar Ferdinand issued a special decree declaring war on Romania. On the same day Bulgarian forces prepared to cross the border and Field Marshal Mackensen received a telegram from the new Chief of the German General Staff von Hindenburg informing him that German and Austro-Hungarian build up in Transylvania would be completed no sooner than the second half of September while the forces that were already deployed would be able only to defend against the advancing Romanians until then. Von Hindenburg and General Zhekov confirmed the orders of the Bulgarian Third Army to advance into Dobrudja in order to draw and defeat as many Romanian and Russian forces as possible, de facto placing the burden of the first Central Powers major offensive during the opening stages of the war on Field Marshal Mackensen, General Toshev and their forces.

A day earlier the commander of the army group and the commander of the Third Army had met in Gorna Oryahovitsa to finalize the offensive plan. General Toshev, who had more up to date intelligence regarding the strength of the opposing forces and their fortification, convinced the field marshal to commit the main forces for an attack of the Tutrakan fortress first, instead of attacking both it and Silistra as was originally noted in the army group directive from 28 August. The two also agreed to deploy troops to cover Silistra against Romanian flanking attacks on the main forces and ensure sufficient reserves to hold the right flank of the army around Dobrich. All the troops detailed for the defense of the Danube were placed under the direct control of the army group headquarters and the Ruse Fortified Area was placed under the command of Colonel Kaufman. For the offensive, General Toshev kept direct control over the field troops of the army consisting of the 1st, 4th and 6th Infantry Divisions, 1st Cavalry Division, the Varna Fortified Area and could also expect to be joined by 1 German and 5 Bulgarian battalions from Colonel Kaufman's forces. Thus by 1 September the attacking forces managed to concentrate 62 infantry battalions, 3 pioneer battalions, 23 squadrons and 55 batteries along the Dobrudja frontier.

Facing the Bulgarian Third Army from the river Olt to the Black Sea coast was the Romanian Third Army commanded by General Mihail Aslan with a total of 149,028 men in 104 battalions and 44 squadrons supported by 235 machine guns and 131 batteries. However, these forces had to cover a long front and only some 72,000 men in 55 battalions and 9 squadrons supported by 173 machine guns and 67 batteries were located in Dobrudja. In addition, the Russian XLVII Corps with up to 40,000 men under the command of General Andrei Zayonchkovski had crossed the Danube and was slowly moving towards the Dobrudja border.

On 2 September the Third Army crossed the border along its entire length from the Danube to the Black Sea. The main forces – the 4th Preslav Division, the 1/1 Infantry Brigade and the reinforced detachment of Colonel Kaufman – all under the command of General Panteley Kiselov headed for Tutrakan, pushing back the Romanian forces to their main defensive lines and encircling the fortress within 48 hours. Meanwhile, the rest of the 1st Division advanced to protect their flanks and the 1st Cavalry Division engaged and defeated the Romanian border guards and vanguards around the village of Kurtbunar managing to cut the communication lines between Silistra and Dobrich. On the right Bulgarian flank the 6th Bdin Division and forces of the Varna Fortified Area formed up in a mobile reserve also advanced, meeting weak resistance in the process.

General Aslan realized that his troops were too scattered and could be defeated piecemeal and ordered on 2 September General Zayonchkovski to move his corps from Cobadin to within 10–15 kilometers of the Bulgarian border but it was not executed and instead on the next day only the cavalry was sent to reconnoitre a 40 kilometer part of the front that was far enough from the main Bulgarian thrust. This allowed General Kolev's 1st Cavalry Division to defeat at the villages of Kochmar and Kara Pelit a brigade of the Romanian 19th Division, dispatched to aid the encircled forces in Tutrakan, and report the capture of some 1,035 of its soldiers. This forced the commander of the 19th Division that was located Dobrich to withdraw his remaining forces from the town and allow the Varna Mobile Reserve to enter it on 4 September. On that day the forces around Tutrakan began preparation for the final assault of the fortress and Major Kurt von Hammerstein-Equord took command of all forces operating against its western sector from Colonel Kaufman.

The attack of the Tutrakan fortress

A day earlier General Toshev had ordered General Kiselov to commence the principal assault on the main Romanian defensive lines around Tutrakan but it was delayed for 5 September. For the attack he could count on a strike force of some 55,000 men deployed in the 4th Preslav Infantry Division (17 battalions), the 1/1 Brigade (8 battalions) and the Hammerstein Detachment (1 German and 5 Bulgarian battalions) or a total of 31 infantry battalions, 7 squadrons, 132 artillery pieces and 57 machine guns. The Romanians could initially oppose the attackers with 19 battalions from the 15th division but they were quickly reinforced to 36 when the fighting began and could count on the support of 246 artillery pieces and 78 machine guns. In total the Romanian command committed some 39,000 men to the battle.

Early in the morning on 5 September the Bulgarian heavy artillery began an artillery barrage designed to severely damage the Romanian fortifications and earthworks. The infantry attack followed soon after with the main blow delivered by the 4th Preslav Division. By nightfall the entire first Romanian defensive line was captured and 13 out of 15 forts had fallen in Bulgarian hands. The defenders had to retreat to their secondary defensive line which was considerably weaker and fell relatively easy on the next day despite the arrival of fresh reinforcements. On that day the Bulgarian 3/1 Brigade intercepted and defeated at the village of Sarsânlar a brigade of the Romanian 9th Division consisting of 9 battalions, 4 batteries and 2 squadrons dispatched from Silistra to aid the Tutrakan garrison.

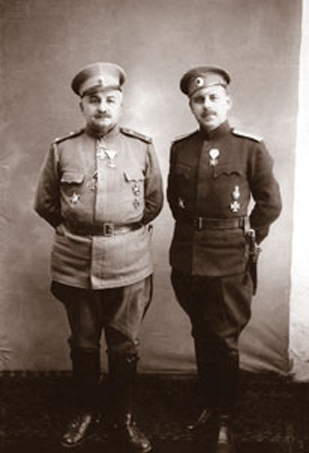
The commander of the forces at Tutrakan, General Kiselov with his chief of staff Colonel Noykov.

When the Battle of Tutrakan ended on 6 September two Romanian infantry divisions were practically destroyed – some 28,500 soldiers and officers along with over 100 cannons, 62 machine guns and thousands of rifles were captured by the Bulgarian Third Army. Up to 7,500 soldiers were killed, wounded or missing and only between 3,500 and 4,000 out of 39,000 managed to swim across the Danube or make their way to Silistra unharmed. The attackers suffered some 9,171 casualties, most of them during the attack on the main defensive line on 5 September, or a rate of some 16% of their forces.

During the final assault on Tutrkan the right wing of the Bulgarian Army came under attack from the Russian XLVII Corps and the Romanian 19th Division at the Battle of Dobrich. Despite the sizable forces of 46 infantry battalions, 17 batteries and 19 squadrons, General Zayonchkovsky achieved little success. The Bulgarian Varna Mobile Reserve, 6th Infantry Division managed to hold their line for two days when on 7 September the first Ottoman troops – the 75th Regiment of the 25th Division arrived and was at once dispatched to support the Bulgarians. The 1st Cavalry Division delivered a flanking attack against the Serbo–Croatian Division which caused its retreat and made the position of the rest of the Russian forces untenable. By nightfall all of the XLVII Corps and the 19th Division were in full retreat and rallied around the village of Cara-Omer further to the north. after the battle all the Bulgarian and Ottoman forces were placed under the command of General Todor Kantardzhiev and became known simply as the Dobrich Forces. It was agreed that until the arrival of the VI Corps headquarters all Ottoman forces will be integrated in the Bulgarian units.

On 10 September Silistra fell to the 1st Sofia Division and the Romanians retired towards lake Oltina. To support the advance of his left wing Field Marshal Mackensen created an entirely German brigade under the command of Colonel Bode consisting of his 45th Reserve Regiment (3 battalions), the 1/21 battalion and supported by 3 squadrons and 3 batteries. The pursuit of the Romanians and Russian was delayed due to logistical difficulties and the relatively large distance between the forces in Silistra and Dobrich. This gave them time to fortify their new positions on the lake Oltina – Cara-Omer – Mangalia line. Finally, two days later the Bulgarian Third Army approached the new positions and prepared to assault them. The line of contact between the equal in size opposing armies was roughly similar with the pre-1913 border between Bulgaria and Romania, that is why the two-day battle that occurred there is sometimes referred to as the Battle of the Old Frontier. The Bulgarians once again achieved victory but failed to encircle the Russian and Romanian divisions which again retreated to a new defensive line around Cobadin.

On 16 September the Third Army reached Cobadin and prepared to assault the position as Field Marshal Mackensen considered his opponents weakened enough. The Romanian high command however had reinforced General Zayonchkovsky's Dobrogea Army with four divisions from Transylvania and placed him under General Averescu's new Army Group of the Southern Armies together with the Romanian Third Army. In reality 55 Bulgarian, 4 German and 3 Ottoman infantry battalions supported by 27 Bulgarian, 3 German squadrons were thrown against more than 70 Romanian and Russian battalions supported 32 Russian and 8 Romanian squadrons. After two days of heavy fighting the Bulgarians and Germans failed to break through and General Toshev decided to call off the attack as the exhaustion of the troops could make them vulnerable to counterattacks. The Bulgarian Third Army suffered around 6,539 casualties in the First Battle of Cobadin and withdrew to its starting positions. The Allied forces, emboldened by their success, attempted to counterattack but by 22 September their efforts had achieved no further gain and were in turn to dig in. For less than three weeks the Bulgarian Third Army had suffered 23,405 casualties bud had received only 3,755 replacements which made General Toshev reluctant to undertake new attacks until the army received more substantial reinforcements.

The Romanian plan for the encirclement of the Bulgarian Third Army.

Now for the first time since the beginning of the campaign the Romanian high command had the initiative in Dobrudja and prepared a large offensive to encircle and destroy the Bulgarian Third Army (see the Flămânda Offensive). General Averescu planned to use the Dobrogea Army to attack the Bulgarian Third Army in an effort to breakthrough and link up with the reinforced Third Romanian Army which was to cross the Danube and advance in the rear of the Bulgarians. So by the end of September, the Romanian Army Group of the Southern Armies had amassed 14 infantry and 2 and one-half cavalry divisions as compared to 10 infantry, 1 cavalry division and 4 Călăraşi brigades in Transylvania. Averescu could count on 195 battalions, 55 squadrons and 169 batteries for the execution of his plan.

Army group Mackensen was also strengthened with heavy artillery and on 24 September the entire VI Ottoman Corps joined the Bulgarian Third Army. In addition, the German 217th Infantry Division was also expected to arrive. With these reinforcements the field marshal could oppose the Romanians and Russians with 110 battalions, 30 squadrons and 72 batteries.

On 1 October parts of the Romanian Third Army crossed the Danube at Ryahovo and began constructing a pontoon bridge. The Bulgarians and Germans had small forces in the area and the commander of the LII corps General Robert Kosch, who was tasked with protecting the Danube, dispatched additional forces from as far as Burgas. The Romanian operation soon stalled in the face of the bad weather, the determined resistance of the outnumbered defenders and the constant attacks of the Austrian Danube Flotilla on the bridge. Under these circumstances General Averescu canceled the operations.

At the same time, the Dobrogea Army attacked the Bulgarian Third Army with superior forces and temporarily achieved limited success at the battle of Amzacea. The Ottoman VI Corps was particularly badly hit and had to abandon some of its positions leaving 2 batteries and several hundred men to be captured by the Romanians. With the help of a few fresh Bulgarian battalions and batteries urgently dispatched by General Toshev the situation was soon stabilized and the lost positions retaken. On 7 October in the face of mounting loses and no success General Zayonchkovsky ordered his troops to halt their attacks and dig in. Thus this second part of General Averescu's plan also failed at a heavy price – the Romanian 19th Division alone had lost 45 officers and 3,150 soldiers. The casualties of the Central Powers exceeded 7,348 more than half of those were in the Ottoman 25th Division and the 74th Regiment.

The deteriorating situation in Transylvania once again forced the Romanian command to alter its plans and shift troops from south to north. This and the arriving reinforcements allowed Field Marshal Mackensen to prepare a second assault on the Rasova – Cobadin line. He divided his forces in Western Group (1st Sofia Division, VI Corps and 4th Preslav Division) and Eastern Group (1st Cavalry Division, Bode Brigade, 217th German Division and the Mixed Bulgarian Division) placing Generals Toshev and Kantardzhiev as their respective commanders. Unlike the previous battles, the field marshal arrived on the battlefield to take personal command of both groups.

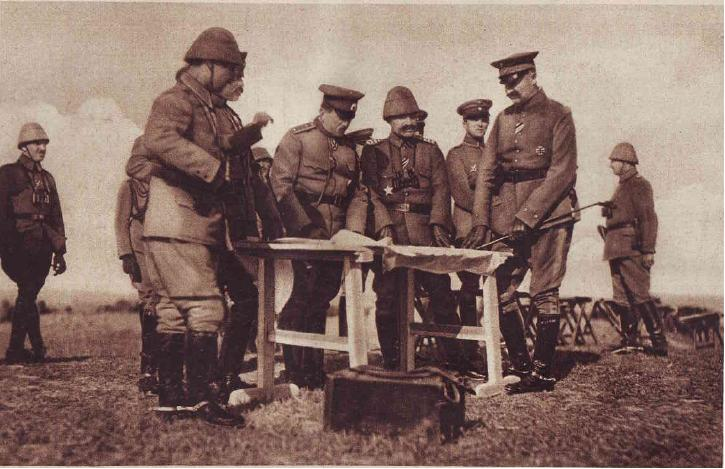
General Toshev and Hilmi Paşa observing the fighting around Medgidia

The Second Battle of Cobadin opened on 19 October with the largest artillery barrage yet seen in the Dobrudja Campaign. The Eastern Group was to execute the main attack in the direction of Topraisar and the Western Group engaging in diversionary actions. General Kantardzhiev's men however met with very strong resistance and were not able to advance decisively for several days at the same time however had greater success and received permission from the field marshal to undertake a general attack in his sector on 20 October. The advance was very successful with the 4th Preslav Division capturing 24 officers and 2,800 soldiers from the Russian 61st Division. The entire center and right of the Russo-Romanian Army was retreating towards Cernavodă and Medgidia while the defensive line between the Danube and Cobadin had fallen in the hands of the Bulgarians and the Ottomans. The Eastern Group now also achieved greater results and forced the Romanians to retreat. On 22 October Bulgarian Cavalry Division entered the strategic port of Constanța and the 4th Preslav Division met, defeated fresh reinforcements from the new IV Russian corps around Medgidia and took the town. Only the Romanian 2nd and 5th divisions, that were reduced to 3,500 and 4,000 combatants, were still holding out at Cernavodă but they too were forced to evacuate that fortress and damage the King Carol I Bridge on 25 October. Thus as a result of the battle, the Central Powers gained control of large stores of supplies and fuel as well as the vital railway between Constanța and Cernavodă. The offensive achieved a penetration depth of some 80 kilometers, or an average of 10 kilometers per an operational day – the highest of all major Bulgarian offensives during World War I.

The field marshal felt free to transfer the 1st Sofia Infantry Division, the German 217th Division (without the 9th Reserve Regiment) and most of the German artillery to Svishtov where they would join General Kosch's Danube Army in preparation to cross the Danube and advance in conjunction with the German Ninth Army against Bucharest. The remainder of the forces in Dobrudja were returned to General Toshev's command and ordered to dig in on a new defensive line between Lake Taşaul and the village of Boasgic (today Dunărea).

As early as 22 October General Zayonchkovsky was replaced as commander of the Russo-Romanian army by General Vladimir Viktorovich Sakharov who received fresh Russian divisions to replace the battered Romanian formations that had to be pulled back and reorganized.

On 6 November the Russian army began closing in on the Bulgarian fortifications with superior forces in an attempt to break the Third Army's line. General Toshev had 45 infantry battalions, 45 batteries and 27 squadrons on the front line and an additional 5 battalions on garrison duties in the rear. A cause for great concern was also the large Russian forces that were concentrating on the left bank of the Danube which prompted the general to ask the Ottoman VI Corps, that had remained directly under the army group control after Cobadin, to be placed under his command. In view of the dangerous situation the field marshal satisfied Toshev's wish. By the middle of November, the battle along the entire line was raging with full force but the misunderstandings and conflicts between Mackensen and the Third Army's command were also peaking. Under German pressure the Bulgarian commander-in-chief, General Nikola Zhekov, relieved Toshev of his command and send him to Macedonia, where he initially served as governor. His place as commander of the Third Army was taken by Major General Stefan Nerezov.

On 1 and 2 December, the Russians made a final attempt to break through but were again repulsed losing considerable numbers of men and material including two armored cars that the Bulgarians captured. The victories of the Danube Army and the fall of Bucharest meant that any new offensives against the Bulgarian Third Army were unlikely. On 15 December the army went on the offensive, initially meeting little resistance until it reached the Isaccea – Tulcea line. By 5 January 1917 however all Russian forces had been thrown in retreat over the Danube and the entire Dobrudja was under the control of the Central Powers.

For the remainder of the war, the Third Army remained in Dobrudja but after the capitulation of Romania and the Russian Empire its main units were transferred to the Macedonian front leaving behind only some garrison and occupation forces. After the capitulation of Bulgaria, in the last days of September 1918, the army was demobilized on 6 November.

=== Commanders ===
- Lieutenant General Stefan Toshev (14 September 1915 – 25 November 1916)
- Major General Stefan Nerezov (25 November 1916 – 30 July 1917)
- Lieutenant General Sava Savov (30 July 1917 – 30 November 1917)
- Lieutenant General Georgi Todorov (30 November 1917 – 12 August 1918)

== The interwar years and World War II ==
With the entry of the Treaty of Neuilly-sur-Seine into force the Bulgarian armed forces suffered serious restrictions. Compulsory military service was abolished, the army was scaled down to only 20,000 men and the formation of units larger than a division was forbidden. In reality, the three army inspectorates continued to function unofficially under the name of "first-class garrisons". After 1928 these restrictions were gradually abolished and new mobilization plans were drawn, that envisaged the deployment initially of four field armies during war.

The Third Army was once again mobilized in 1940 and consisted of the 1st, 4th, 5th and 12th infantry divisions as well as the Bulgarian navy, all under the command of General Georgi Popov. On 21 September in accordance with the Treaty of Craiova the army entered Southern Dobrudja that was returned to the Kingdom of Bulgaria after 26 years of Romanian rule. It remained there for the next several years.

In September 1944 Bulgaria switched sides and declared war on Germany and the command of the Third Army was taken over by General Asen Krstev. Due to different concerns of the government this army did not directly take part in the fighting, instead it was tasked with the formation and training of different units that were later sent to the front and especially to the Bulgarian First Army. A notable example was the Third Army's 3rd Infantry Division which took part in the Battle of the Transdanubian Hills as part of Operation Frühlingserwachen.

=== Commanders ===
- Major General Georgi Popov (1940–1941)
- Lieutenant General Nikola Stoychev (1941-1943)
- Lieutenant General Nikola Hristov (1943–1944)
- Major General Asen Krstev (1944)
- Lieutenant General Raycho Slavkov (1944–1945)
- Lieutenant General Nikola Genchev (1945)

== Post-World War II years ==
In 1951 the headquarters of the army was moved from Varna to Sliven, reflecting the shift of strategic focus of the Bulgarian Army as part of the Eastern Bloc. By the end of the fifties the cavalry units were abolished and the army was entirely mechanized, the infantry divisions were transformed into rifle and motor rifle divisions. Gradually new weapon systems like multiple rocket launchers, parachute detachments and air support units were integrated in the army.

In 1980 the army included the 7th Motor Rifle Division (bg:Седма мотострелкова дивизия), Yambol; the 16th Motor Rifle Division with its headquarters at Burgas; the 18th Motor Rifle Division at Shumen; the 13th Tank Brigade at Sliven; the 24th Tank Brigade (Aytos); the 66th Army Missile Brigade (Kabile); the 45th Army Artillery Regiment (Targovishte); and the 55th Army Anti-Tank Regiment (Karnobat), engineer, communications regiment, a parachute battalion, plus other smaller units.

After 1989 the Bulgarian Land Forces entered a new stage of its development characterized with a rapid reduction of the armed forces. In accordance with a new program for the transition to a corps and brigade structure of the army the Third Army was transformed into the 3rd Army Corps; the 16th Motor Rifle Division was reduced to a brigade After 2004 many of the army's formations were closed. In 2003 the corps was again transformed into the "Eastern" command with greatly reduced forces and capabilities. By the end of 2006, this, too, was abolished and the units under its command were placed directly under the control of the Land Forces Headquarters. This marked the end of the Bulgarian Third Army after almost a century of existence.

== See also ==
- First Army
- Second Army
- Fourth Army
- 11th Macedonian Infantry Division

== Sources ==
- Hall, Richard C. (2000). The Balkan Wars, 1912–1913: Prelude to the First World War. Routledge. ISBN 0-415-22946-4.
- Erickson, Edward J. (2003). Defeat in Detail: The Ottoman Army in the Balkans, 1912–1913. Greenwood Publishing Group. ISBN 0-275-97888-5.
- Христов, А. (1946). Печатница на Армейското боенно издателство.
- Министерство на войната, Щаб на войската (1938). Българската армия в Световната война 1915–1918, Vol. III. Държавна печатница, София.
- Щаб на войската. "Българската армия в Световната война, vol. VIII"; Държавна печатница,София 1939
- Kiriţescu, Constantin (1926). Istoria războiului pentru întregirea României: 1916-1919/История на войната за обединението на Румъния. Войната в Добруджа. Печатница на армейското военно издателство, София.
- Glenn E. Torrey, "The Battle of Turtucaia (Tutrakan) (2–6 September 1916): Romania's Grief, Bulgaria's Glory".East European Quarterly, Vol. 37, 2003
- Glaise-Horstenau, Edmund (1934). Österreich-Ungarns letzter Krieg 1914-1918. Wien, Verlag der Militärwissenschaftlichen Mitteilungen.
- Third Army (3rd Corps, "Eastern" Command)
