= Army Group Mackensen (Romania) =

Military formation during WWI

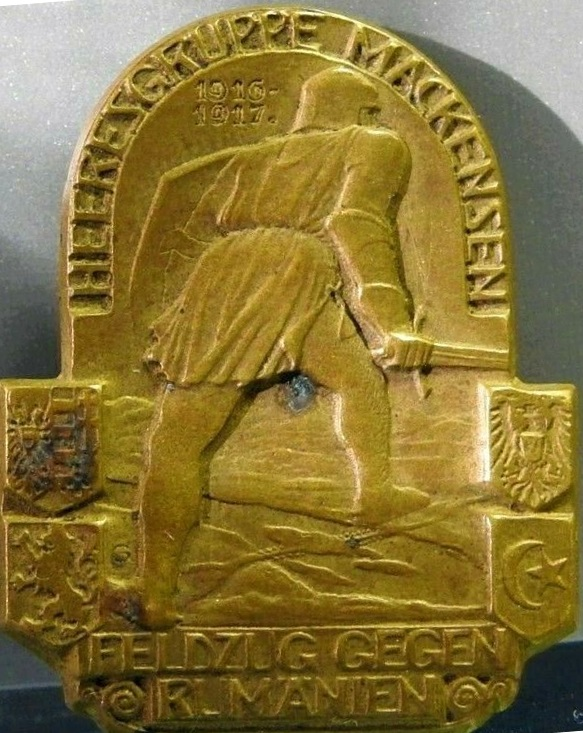
Cap badge of Army Group Mackensen

The Army Group Mackensen (German: Heeresgruppe Mackensen) which operated against Romania between 28 August 1916 and 7 May 1918 during World War I under the command of field marshal Mackensen, was an Army Group of the Imperial German Army.

== History ==
This Army Group was established in August 1916 to attack Romania from the South. In September, following significant initial success, the first invasion was temporarily halted by the Romanians and Russians, but in October 1916, Constanța was taken, and on 6 December Bucharest. The Romanians fell back to Western Moldavia and held the front line on the Eastern Carpathians and the Siret-Danube line throughout 1917 and early 1918 until the signing of the Treaty of Bucharest (1918) on 7 May 1918.

The Army Group was disbanded on 1 July 1918 and Mackensen became head of the Supreme Command of the Occupation Army (Oberkommando des Besatzungsheeres).

=== Composition ===
- Bulgarian Third Army (Stefan Toshev, succeeded by Stefan Nerezov and Georgi Todorov)
- German Danube Army (Robert Kosch)
- Ottoman VI Army Corps (Mustafa Hilmi Pasha) (October 1916 - February 1918)
- German 9th Army (Erich von Falkenhayn, succeeded by Johannes von Eben) (December 1916 - May 1918)
