= Battle of Amzacea =

- Part of the Dobruja campaign of the Romanian campaign of World War I
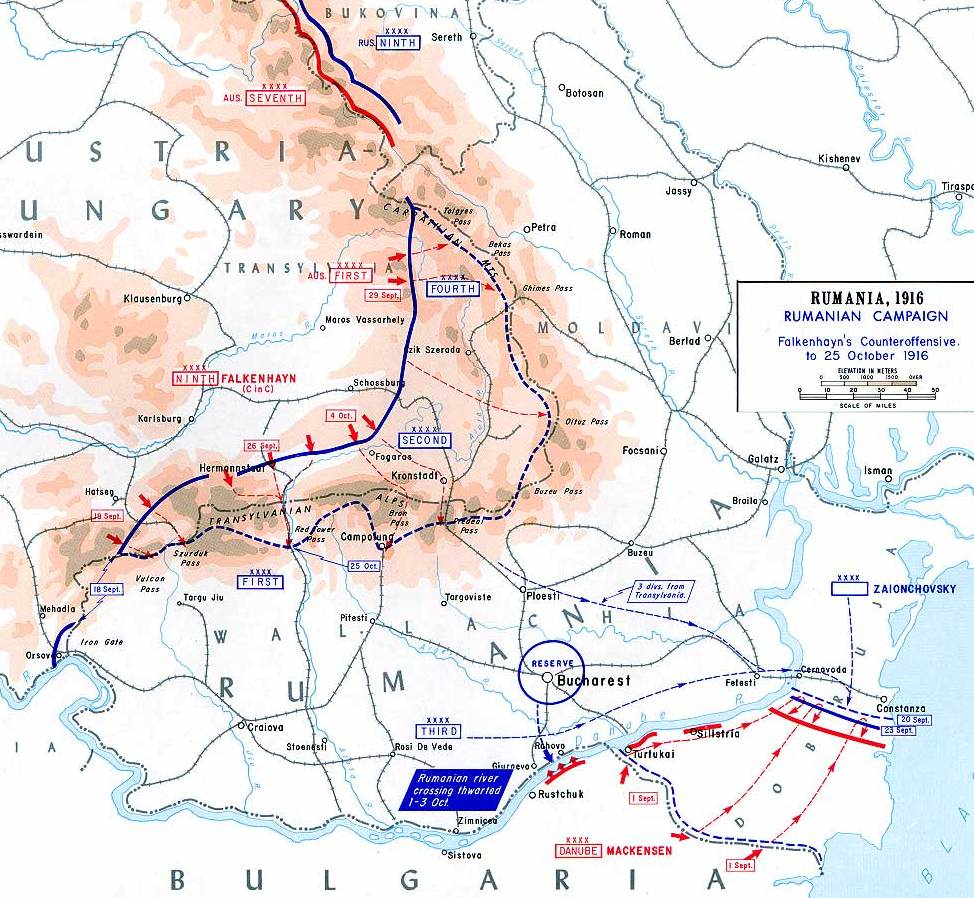
- The counterattack of Central Powers, September–October 1916
Date	21 September 1916 – 4 October 1916
Location	Amzacea, Kingdom of Romania
Result	Inconclusive

Belligerents
Central Powers: Ottoman Empire; Bulgaria	Allied Powers: Romania; Russia

Commanders and leaders
(Ottoman Empire) Şükrü Bey (Bulgaria) Todor Kantardzhiev	(Romania) Constantin Scărișoreanu

Casualties and losses
Ottoman Empire: 3,534 casualties; 415 killed; 2,226 wounded; 893 missing	Romania: 4,657 casualties; 812 killed; 2,893 wounded; 952 missing

The Battle of Amzacea was a military engagement fought between Allied (Romanian and Russian) and Central Powers (Turkish and Bulgarian) forces during the Romanian campaign of World War I. The battle was part of the Dobruja campaign.

== Background ==
According to the Campaign Plan, three-quarters of the total operational forces were allocated to the Northwestern Front on the Carpathian border, while the Southern Front - which stretched from Orșova to the Black Sea and was of secondary importance - was allocated only a quarter of the total operational forces. The forces on this front had the mission of stopping and repelling a possible offensive in the event of Bulgaria's entry into the war. Within the complex framework of wartime strategy, August von Mackensen meticulously devised his offensive operations, originally scheduled to commence on 1 September 1916. However, the execution of these plans was impeded by significant logistical challenges, most notably the poor condition of the railway network in northern Bulgaria. These difficulties delayed the arrival of the Turkish units at the front. It was not until 4 September that the 75th Regiment of the 25th Division reached Pravade, marking the beginning of their movement toward the operational area. Despite these constraints, the entrainment and deployment of the Turkish forces proceeded with notable efficiency, and by 19 September, they were fully positioned and prepared for combat operations.

== Battle ==
The Turkish forces first engagement in Romania took place on 24 September. 25th Turkish Division, positioned with Bulgarian cavalry on its right flank and the Bulgarian 6th Division on its left, received orders to launch an assault on the town of Amzacea. At precisely 9:15 a.m., the offensive commenced with the opening of artillery fire, signaling the beginning of the Turkish contingent’s active participation in the Romanian campaign. On 1 October the Russo-Romanian forces, from Topraisar, moving south to Amzacea, encountered the Turkish and Bulgarian divisions. The progress was laborious and slow under the enemy’s artillery fire. The Romanian 19th Infantry Division on 3 October defeated the 25th Turkish Division and captured Amzacea after a bayonet charge. This was termed the beautiful victory of Amzacea by Romanian sources. But Amzacea was lost once more in consequence of the 12th and 15th Romanian Divisions being transferred to the north. The region was evacuated shortly thereafter, with the Russo-Romanian troops subsequently retreating to their original lines. Turkish forces suffered 3,534 casualties, while Romanian forces suffered 4,657 casualties.
