= Ivan Kolev (general) =

Bulgarian general (1863–1917)

- Born: 15 September 1863; Bannivka, United Principalities
- Died: 29 July 1917 (aged 54); Vienna, Austria-Hungary
- Military career
- Allegiance: Bulgaria
- Branch: Bulgarian Army
- Service years: 1885–1917
- Rank: lieutenant general
- Nickname: Father of the cavalry
- Commands: 1st Cavalry Brigade; 10th Infantry Division; 1st Cavalry Division
- Conflicts: First Balkan War; Bulgarian front; Second Balkan War; First World War; Romanian Campaign; Battle of Dobrich; First Battle of Cobadin; Second Battle of Cobadin
- Awards

Ivan Kolev Stoyanov (Bulgarian: Иван Колев Стоянов) (15 September 1863 in Banovka – 29 July 1917 in Vienna) was a Bulgarian lieutenant general and distinguished cavalry commander during World War I.

== Biography ==
Ivan Kolev was born in the southern Bessarabian village of Banovka, then part of Romania, which was founded by Bulgarian refugees from Thrace and situated about 25 kilometers to the east of Bolhrad. Ivan received his primary education in his birthplace and from 1875 continued studying in the Bolhrad High School which he graduated in 1882. After this, he wanted to become a teacher in Banovka but his application was rejected and instead Kolev became a clerk in the local municipality.

In 1884, he moved to Sofia where he worked as assistant secretary of the Sofia District Court and was soon promoted to secretary. A year later, Ivan took part in the defense of the unification of the Principality of Bulgaria and the province of Eastern Rumelia as volunteer in the Student's Legion during the Serbo-Bulgarian War.

On 14 January 1886, he was admitted to the Military School in Sofia and, due to his high grades, the young cadet was assigned to study in the artillery section. This, however, did not satisfy him as Ivan was fond of riding and declared that he would leave the military service unless he was assigned to the cavalry. Kolev finally got what he'd wished for, graduated the Military School on 27 April 1887 as a lieutenant, and was assigned to the Third Cavalry Regiment. On 18 May 1890, he was promoted to first lieutenant and after completing the necessary exams was admitted to the Military Academy of Turin in early 1892.

On 2 August 1894, Kolev was promoted to rotmister and returned to Bulgaria after having successfully graduated in Italy. Soon after, he was assigned as an officer to the General Staff of the Bulgarian Army and lectured the officers in the cavalry school on military history. Following his initiative, the youngest cavalry officers underwent special cavalry courses and the first army horse races were organized. During Autumn 1898, he attended army maneuvers in Romania and, in 1904, was promoted to lieutenant colonel.

In 1907, Kolev was sent to train in the Austrian Army and was assigned to the 7th Uhlan Regiment in Pardubice. In 1908, he returned to Bulgaria, was promoted to colonel, and was assigned to command His Majesty's Life Guard Cavalry Regiment – the elite cavalry unit of the army and honor escort unit of the Bulgarian monarch.

=== Balkan Wars (1912–1913) ===
At the start of the First Balkan War, Ivan Kolev was serving as chief of staff of the Yambol fortified area and in November 1912 was temporarily chief of staff of the Third Army. During the Second Balkan War, he served as chief of staff of the Fifth Army.

On 2 August 1915, Kolev was promoted to major general.

=== First World War ===
During World War I, he served initially as commander of the 10th Infantry Division but was soon returned to the cavalry when on 8 May 1916 he received the command of the 1st Cavalry Division and a few days later was made inspector general of the cavalry. These steps were taken by the Bulgarian high command as a precautionary measure against a possible threat from Romania. In view of this, General Kolev began a general reformation of his cavalry division and besides the attention he devoted to the physical and moral state of the soldiers and horses, he also introduced dismounted machine gun squadrons and increased the number of guns in the division's batteries to six. In July, the commander and his division were ordered to join the Bulgarian Third Army and take up positions close to the Dobrudja frontier.

Romania declared war and invaded Austria-Hungary on 27 August 1916. Bulgaria responded by declaring war on Romania on 1 September and initiating the planned first major offensive of the Central Powers during the Romanian Campaign. The operation was entrusted to the Bulgarian Third Army under General Stefan Toshev and Field Marshal August von Mackensen. General Kolev was ordered to cut the communications between Dobrich and Silistra in order to assist the assault of the army's left wing on the important fortress of Tutrakan. The division achieved this task relatively easily when it captured the village of Kurtbunar on 2 of September. General Kolev then defeated a counterattack of parts of the Romanian 19th Division at the villages of Kochmar and Karapelit thus creating the possibility of his division to encircle Dobrich from the north east. Faced with this threat, the commander of the 19th Division ordered the evacuation of the town which was then occupied by Bulgarian forces. Thus, General Kolev and his division had done their part for the Bulgarian victory at Tutrakan on September 6. On that day, the division resumed its task of protecting the flank of the forces at Tutrakan; while at Dobrich, the right wing of the Bulgarian Third Army came under attack from the superior forces of the Russian XLVII Corps and Romanian 19th Division. On 7 September, the sound of the artillery fire reached the cavalry division and forced General Kolev to inquire about the situation. After he received the information that the Bulgarian forces were outnumbered and in great danger of being defeated, he decided to act without direct orders from General Toshev and assist the Bulgarian 6th Division at Dobrich. This decision proved crucial in preventing a disaster on the right wing of the Third Army as it allowed Kolev's 1st Cavalry Division to appear and attack the flank of the Serbo-Croatian Division at a critical point of the Battle of Dobrich, forcing the retreat of that division which in turn caused the retreat of all the other Russian and Romanian forces. Following this victory, the Bulgarians continued pursuing their retreating opponents and once again defeated them on the Lake Oltina - Cara-Omer - Mangalia line and reached the Cobadin fortified line.

General Kolev led his division in the First Battle of Cobadin, but despite their efforts the Bulgarians were forced to suspend their attack due to the losses and exhaustion they had suffered from the almost three weeks of continuous fighting. This allowed the Romanians and Russians for the first time since the beginning of the campaign to gain the initiative and prepare a major offensive aimed at the destruction of the Bulgarian Third Army. To achieve this they concentrated a force of 124 infantry battalions, 89 artillery batteries and 31 cavalry squadrons that were supposed to attack and penetrated the Bulgarian lines while the Romanian Third Army crossed the Danube at Flămânda and advanced in their rear. The Bulgarians also consolidated their position when the Ottoman 25th Division and General Kolev's cavalry division took the villages of Amzacea and Perveli (now Moşneni) on 24 of September.

General Kolev's actions and personal example earned him the respect of his superiors and, on 30 September 1916, Field Marshal Mackensen arrived in the headquarters of the cavalry division to personally award him the German Iron Cross on behalf of Kaiser Wilhelm II. The field marshal, who was a cavalryman himself, praised the actions of General Kolev as proof that the cavalry was still able to beat the infantry in the field in spite of the opposite opinion that prevailed among the prominent German cavalry commanders. Mackensen also warned the general of the expected Romanian and Russian offensive and advised him to act "always onwards and sidewards". Later that day, the headquarters of the Third Army confirmed the warnings and dispatched reinforcements to the cavalry division.

On 1 October, the expected offensive began with the brunt of their attacks directed against the Ottoman 25th Division and the Bulgarian cavalry division. General Kolev once again successfully defended his positions against an entire Romanian infantry division supported by another Russian cavalry division. Nevertheless, despite their efforts and numerical superiority the Romanians and Russians failed to achieve success in the Battle of Amzacea and their offensive failed leaving the initiative once again in the hands of the Bulgarians and their allies. For some ten days during the heavy fighting, General Kolev remained on the very front of the battle often in the trenches where he was exposed to severe rain and low temperatures that began affecting his health.

On 19 October, the Central Powers began the decisive second attempt to break the Allied Cobadin Fortified Line. The right wing of the forces was tasked with delivering the decisive blow but its initial assault achieved little. Only General Kolev's cavalry division, reinforced with infantry units, once again enjoyed somewhat greater success. It was in this difficult situation that the cavalry proved the advantage of its mobility and managed to overcome the heavy enemy fire on 20 October. Breaking through the main defensive line, General Kolev pushed back the Romanians and Russians towards the important village of Topraisar and threatened their flank. This and the success of the left wing of the Central Powers forces made the Allied positions untenable and they soon began a general retreat. Following his orders, General Kolev began their pursuit almost immediately, defeated the withdrawing Romanians and Russians at Constanţa, and entered the vital port city. These successes allowed the Bulgarian Third Army to advance some 80 kilometers and assume defensive positions along the narrowest part of Dobruja between the Danube and the Black Sea which in turn permitted Field Marshal Mackensen to focus on the crossing of the river at Svishtov and the operations against Bucharest that were to be carried out in conjunction with the German 9th Army.

General Kolev and his favorite horse, Pirin.

In November, the cavalry division had to undergo some structural changes ordered by the new commander of the Third Army, General Stefan Nerezov, that were opposed by Kolev. Despite the reduction of its size, however, the division continued fighting in Dobruja and ended the campaign on 4 January 1917 with the capture of Tulcea. By now, however, the general's health had begun to decline and, after a battle journey of 1000 kilometers, he gave up the command of his division on 10 March 1917.

On 28 July 1917, Ivan Kolev was promoted to lieutenant general; at the time, he was undergoing medical treatment in Austria. The disease he had contracted, however, proved fatal and Ivan Kolev died on 29 of July in Vienna. His body was returned to Bulgaria and laid to rest in Sofia.

His favorite horse, Pirin, with which he fought throughout the four months of the Dobruja Campaign, became a legend in the army and continued serving until 21 May 1925 when it was retired due to its old age (it was 15 years old at that time).

Today, two villages in Southern Dobruja as well as numerous streets in several Bulgarian cities are named after him.

== Awards ==
- Order of Bravery, II grade and III grade, 1st and 2nd class
- Order of St Alexander, III grade with swords
- Order of Military Merit, IV and V grade with crown
- Order for Merit
- Commemorative Medal for the Serbian-Bulgarian War 1885
- Commemorative Medal for the accession to the throne of Prince Ferdinand I in 1887
- German Iron Cross, I and II class
- Italian Order of the Crown of Italy, IV grade
- Romanian Order of the Romanian Crown, III grade
- Russian Order of Saint Stanislaus II grade
- Serbian Order of the White Eagle III grade
- Ottoman Gallipoli Star ("Iron Crescent")
- Austro-Hungarian Franz Joseph 60th Jubilee Medal

== Sources ==
- Nedev, Svetlozar (2005). "General Ivan Kolev" (PDF) (in Bulgarian). Военноисторически сборник/MILITARY HISTORICAL COLLECTION. pp. 9–15. Archived from the original (PDF) on 2010-02-15.
- General Kolev(in Bulgarian)
- Пеев, П., Генерал-лейтенант Иван Колев, София, 1943, Библиотека прослава, Година 1, Книга 1
- Билярски, Ц., Генерал-лейтенант Иван Колев – добруджанския герой (сборник) I и II том, София, 2008, Издателство „Анико“
- Bakalov, Georgi (2003). Том 5 от История на българите: Военна история на българите от древността до наши дни. TRUD Publishers. ISBN 978-954-621-235-1.
- Kisiov, Aleksandŭr (1928). Генерал Колев и действията на I. Конна дивизия в Добруджа през 1916. Печатниза на армейски военно издателски фонд.
- Министерство на войната, Щаб на войската (1938). Българската армия в Световната война 1915–1918, Vol. III. Държавна печатница, София.
- Тошев, Стефан (1938). Победени без да бъдем бити. Печатниза на армейски военно издателски фонд.
