= 30th Army Corps (Russian Empire) =

- Country: Russian Empire
- Allegiance: Imperial Russian Army
- Engagements: World War I

The 30th Army Corps was an Army corps in the Imperial Russian Army.

== Part of ==
- 11th Army: 1914 - 1915
- 9th Army: 1915
- 8th Army: 1915 - 1916
- Russian Special Army: 1916
- 4th Army: 1916 - 1917

== Commanders ==
- 1915-1916: Andrei Zayonchkovski
