= Battle of Bazargic =

WW1 Battle

- Part of the Dobruja Campaign of the Romanian Campaign of World War I
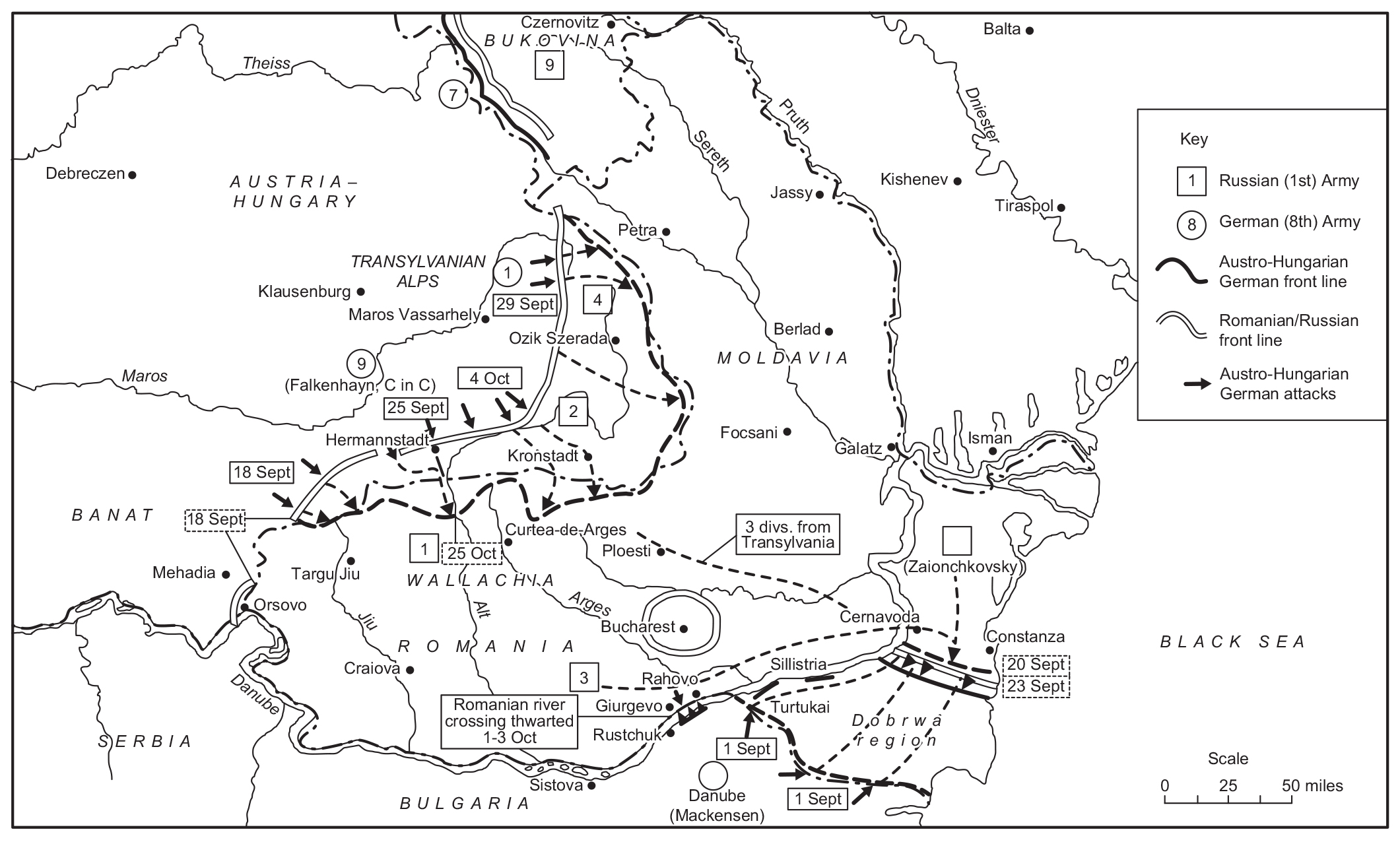
- Map of the Romanian campaign
Date	5 September 1916 – 7 September 1916
Location	Bazargic, Kingdom of Romania (now Dobrich, Bulgaria) 43°34′0″N 27°50′0″E
Result	Central Powers victory

Belligerents
Central Powers: Bulgaria; Germany; Ottoman Empire	Allied Powers: Romania; Russian Empire; Serbia

Commanders and leaders
(Bulgaria) Stefan Toshev (Bulgaria) Ivan Kolev (Bulgaria) Todor Kantardzhiev	Andrei Zayonchkovski

Strength
23 battalions,10 artillery batteries, 17 cavalry squadrons	46 battalions,17 artillery batteries,19 cavalry squadrons

Casualties and losses
1,053 killed 2,324 wounded	Serbia: 8,539 dead and wounded

The Battle of Bazargic, also known as the Battle of Dobrich or the Dobrich epopee (Bulgarian: Добричка епопея), (Russian: Битва при Добриче), took place between 5 and 7 September 1916 between a joint Bulgarian–German–Ottoman force, consisting mainly of the Bulgarian Third Army, and a Romanian–Russian force, including a Division of Serbian Volunteers serving under the Russian 47th Corps. The battle was part of the Romanian campaign towards the end of 1916. It ended with a Central Powers victory.

== Background ==
Although bound by the pre-war Triple Alliance to the Central Powers, Romania instead joined the Triple Entente in August 1916, following the signing of the Treaty of Bucharest (1916). German Commander Field Marshal August von Mackensen was put in charge of the Romanian campaign in the Dobruja front. In September the 3rd Bulgarian Army was reinforced with two Ottoman divisions and part of a German division. The Central Powers' plan was to attack the Romanian forces in Transylvania, while at the same time attacking along the Black Sea, into South Dobruja, a region inhabited mainly by Bulgarians and assigned to Romania in 1913, as a result of the Second Balkan War and the ensuing Treaty of Bucharest (1913).

== Battle ==
Mackensen started with a surprise move on Turtucaia, a Romanian fortress. Although the besieging force was smaller than the garrison, most surrendered quickly to the Bulgarian 3rd Army after their commander fled.

Along with German reinforcements, Bulgarian units on the Southern front who crossed the border and invaded the Dobruja found themselves facing the Romanian Third Army and two Russian infantry divisions. Some of the Romanian units had surrendered to the Russians, believing them to be Bulgarians.

Simultaneously with the assault of the fortress of Turtucaia, the Bulgarian Third Army defeated the Romanian-Russian force, including the First Serbian Volunteer Division, at the Battle of Bazargic, despite their numerical superiority. The crucial point in the battle was the arrival of General Kolev's 1st Cavalry Division, which attacked the Serbian Volunteer Division, forcing their retreat and consequently the retreat of their Romanian and Russian comrades as well. The outnumbered forces of the Central Powers managed to push the Romanians and the Russians north, while the Serbian Volunteer Division suffered heavy casualties with 8,539 dead and wounded.

On 7 September after intense fighting the defeated Russian general ordered a withdrawal.

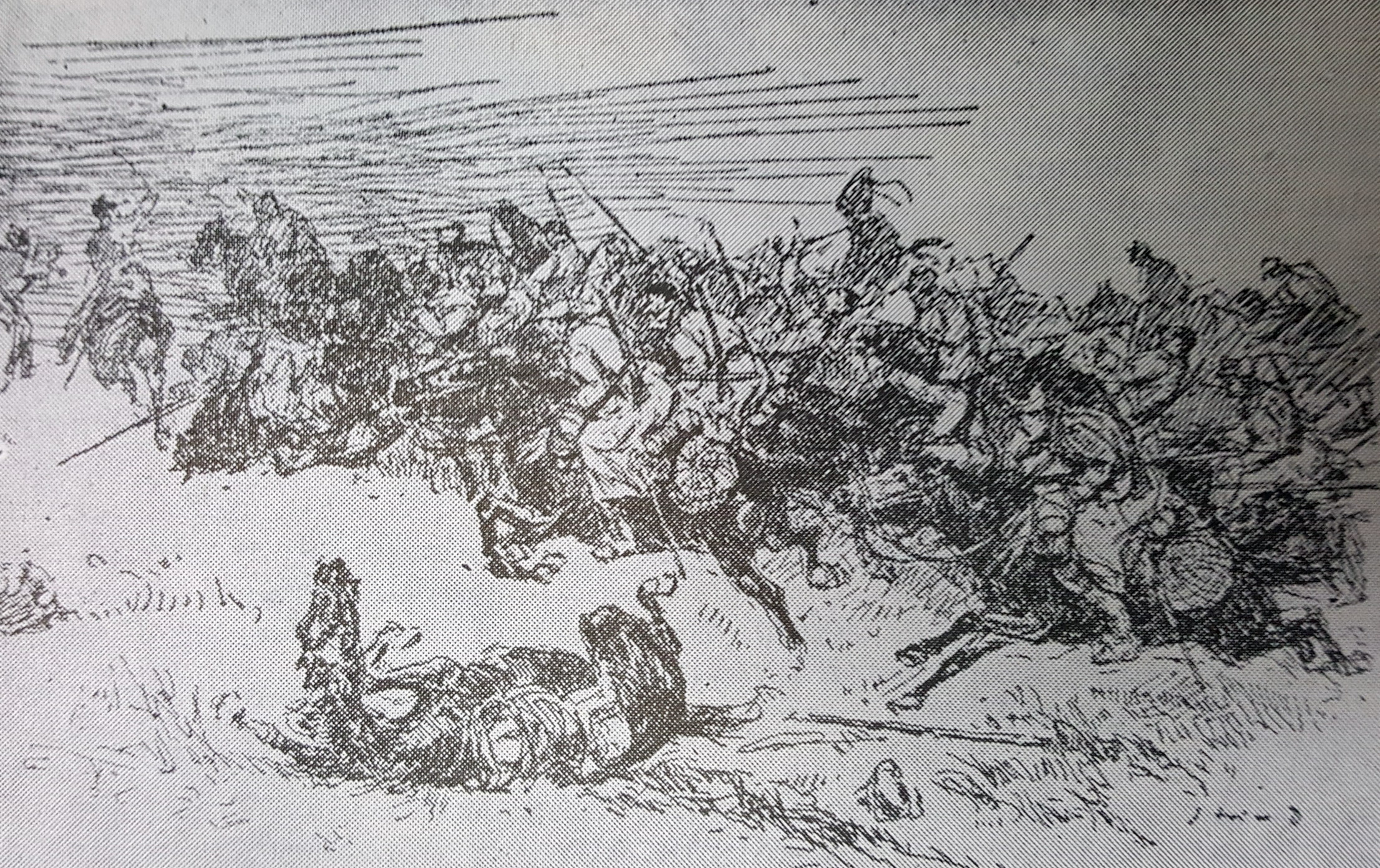
Romanian cavalry charge during the battle of Bazargic

== Aftermath ==
As the Romanian army withdrew into Moldavia by the beginning of November, the Central Powers had captured the whole of Dobruja.
