= 16th Motor Rifle Division =

Army unit

The 16th Motor Rifle Division was a division of the Bulgarian Land Forces, active from the 1960 to the 1990s.

== History ==
The 16th Mountain Rifle Brigade was established in 1950 with its headquarters in Zvezdets, being given the old number of the 16th Infantry Division. On February 6, 1961, the brigade was transformed into the 16th Motor Rifle Division, by Ministerial Order No. 0034. The headquarters of the division is in the city Burgas. It consisted of the 96th Motor Rifle Regiment with its headquarters in Burgas, the 33rd Motor Rifle Regiment with headquarters in the village of Zvezdets, the 37th Motor Rifle Regiment in Tsarevo, the 16th Motor Rifle Regiment in Grudovo (today Sredets and the 88th Artillery Regiment again in Sredets.

The division's goal was to defend Bulgaria's southeastern border with Turkey, as part of the 3rd Army. After 1990, the division was transformed into the 16th Mechanised Brigade, which in 1998 was named "White Sea" (a Bulgarian name for the Aegean Sea). In 2000 the brigade was finally closed. The brigade was the successor of the Tenth White Sea Infantry Division and the 16th Infantry Division.
