= Second Battle of Cobadin =

1916 WWI battle in Romania

- Part of the Dobruja Campaign of the Romanian Campaign of World War I
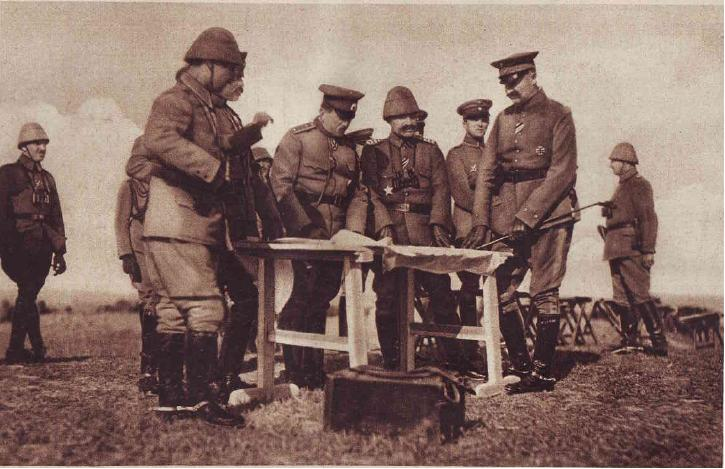
- Stefan Toshev and Mustafa Hilmi Pasha observing the fighting around Medgidia
Date	19–25 October 1916
Location	Rasova, Cobadin, Cernavodă; Romania
Result	Central Powers victory

Belligerents
Bulgaria; German Empire; Ottoman Empire	Romania; Russian Empire

Commanders and leaders
(German Empire) August von Mackensen (Bulgaria) Stefan Toshev (Bulgaria) Todor Kantardzhiev (Bulgaria) Ivan Kolev (Bulgaria) Panteley Kiselov (Bulgaria) Ianko Draganov (Bulgaria) Stefan Popov (Ottoman Empire) Mustafa Hilmi Pasha	(Kingdom of Romania) Alexandru Averescu (Kingdom of Romania) Alexandru Socec (Kingdom of Romania) Alexandru Hartel (Kingdom of Romania) Constantin Scărișoreanu (Kingdom of Romania) Traian Găiseanu (Kingdom of Romania) Eremia Grigorescu; Andrei Zayonchkovski

Strength
(Tsardom of Bulgaria (1908–1946)) 65 battalions and 28 squadrons; 60,207 riflemen (Ottoman Empire) 18 battalions; 11,374 riflemen (German Empire) 13 battalions Total: 96 battalions and 28 squadrons; 71,581+ riflemen	(Kingdom of Romania) 71 battalions and 8 squadrons 45 battalions and 32 squadrons Total: 116 battalions and 40 squadrons

Casualties and losses
(Tsardom of Bulgaria (1908–1946)) 11,575+ (Ottoman Empire) 5,432 (German Empire) Unknown Total: 17,007+	Heavy including 6,700 captured (from 19 to 21 October alone)

The Second Battle of Cobadin took place from 19 to 25 October 1916 between the Central Powers, chiefly the Bulgarian Third Army, and the Entente, represented by the Russo–Romanian Dobruja Army. The battle ended in a decisive victory for the Central Powers; it resulted in the occupation of the strategic port of Constanța and the capture of the railway between that city and Cernavodă.

== The Battle ==
The Romanian Second Army, led by major general Alexandru Averescu, fielded the following units:

- 2nd Infantry Division, commanded by brigadier general Alexandru Socec.
- 5th Infantry Division, commanded by brigadier general Alexandru Hartel.
- 9th Infantry Division, commanded by brigadier general Constantin Scărișoreanu
- 12th Infantry Division, commanded by brigadier general Traian Găiseanu.
- 15th Infantry Division, commanded by brigadier general Eremia Grigorescu.
- 5th Călărași Brigade, commanded by colonel Constantin Carataș.

The Russian Dobruja Army, led by general Andrei Zayonchkovski, comprised the 47th Army Corps. Its main components were:

- 61st Infantry Division, commanded by major general Panteleimon Nikolaevich Simanski.
- 115th Infantry Division, commanded by major general Lev Lvovich Baikov.
- 3rd Cavalry Division, commanded by lieutenant general Evgeniy Aleksandrovich Leontovich.
- First Serbian Volunteer Division, commanded by colonel Stevan Hadžić.

The Bulgarian Third Army, led by lieutenant general Stefan Toshev, comprised the following units:

- 1st Infantry Division, commanded by brigadier general Ianko Draganov.
- 4th Infantry Division, commanded by brigadier general Panteley Kiselov.
- 6th Infantry Division, commanded by brigadier general Stefan Popov.
- Combined Division, commanded by major general Todor Kantardzhiev.
- 1st Cavalry Division, commanded by major general Ivan Kolev.

== Aftermath ==
=== Battle of the Danube Delta ===
Despite the loss of most of Dobruja to the Central Powers, the Romanian defensive victory at Tulcea in January 1917, combined with the actions of the Romanian cruiser Elisabeta at the mouths of the Danube, ensured Romanian control over the entire Danube Delta throughout the rest of the War.

== See also ==
- First Battle of Cobadin

== Sources ==
- Министерство на войната, Щаб на войската (1943). Българската армия в Световната война 1915–1918, Vol. IX. Държавна печатница, София.
- Kirițescu, Constantin (1922). Istoria războiului pentru întregirea României: 1916–1919. București: România Nouă. OCLC 935411585.
- Тошев, Стефан (2007). Действията на III армия в Добруджа през 1916 год. Захарий Стоянов. ISBN 978-954-739-976-1.
- Pollard, A.F. (2006). A Short History of the Great War. BiblioBazaar. ISBN 978-1-4264-2180-8.
