= Amzacea =

- Commune
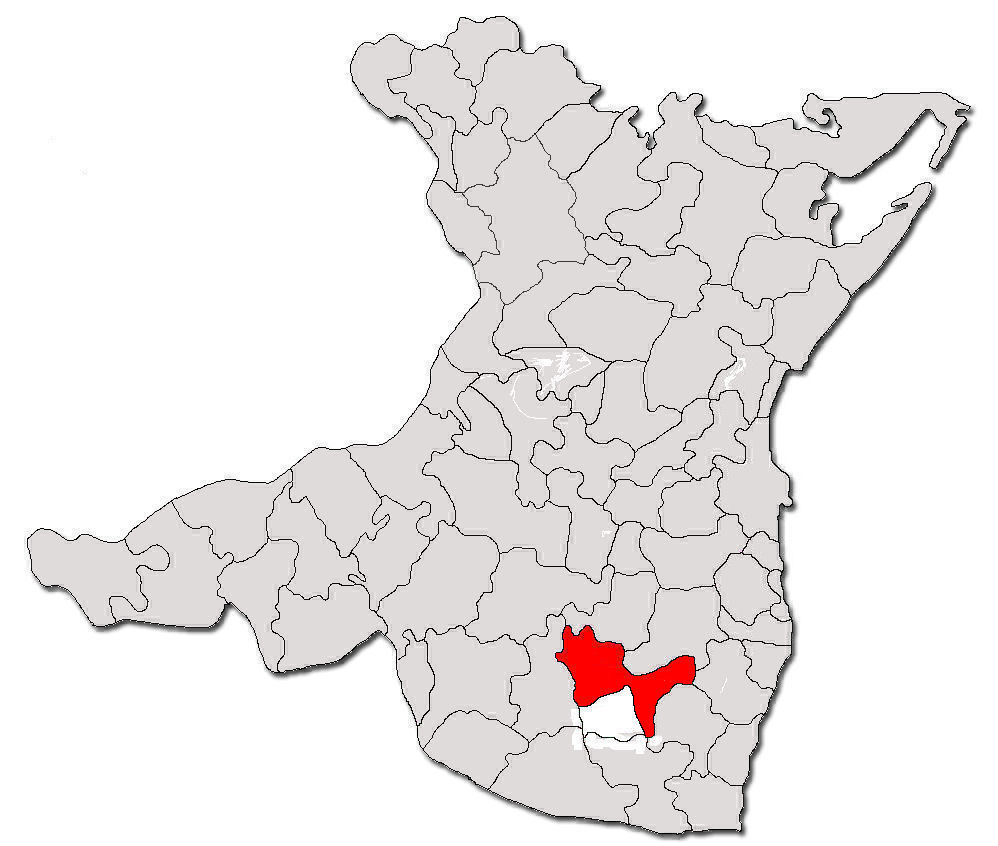
- Location in Constanța County

- Location in Romania
- Coordinates: 43°57′32″N 28°23′46″E
- Country: Romania
- County: Constanța
- Subdivisions: Amzacea, Casicea, General Scărișoreanu

Government
  - Mayor (2020–2024): Romică Stan (PSD)
- Area: 130.47 km^{2} (50.37 sq mi)
- Population (2021-12-01): 2,454
  - Density: 19/km^{2} (49/sq mi)
- Time zone: EET/EEST (UTC+2/+3)
- Vehicle reg.: CT
- Website: www.primaria-amzacea.ro

Amzacea (Romanian pronunciation: [amˈzatʃe̯a]) is a commune in Constanța County, Northern Dobruja, Romania. It includes three villages:

- Amzacea (historical names: Amuza-aci, Turkish: Hamzaça, Amzaça)
- Casicea (historical name: Maior Chiriacescu)
- General Scărișoreanu (historical names: Enghez, Turkish: Engez) - named after the Romanian World War I General Constantin Scărișoreanu. Scărișoreanu received the promotion from Colonel to Brigadier General on the battlefield after the fierce defense of the Topraisar-Amzacea sector of the front by his division during the Second Battle of Cobadin.

== Demographics ==
At the 2011 census, Amzacea had 2,231 Romanians (85.58%), 239 Turks (9.17%), 128 Tatars (4.91%), 4 Lipovans (0.15%), 5 others (0.19%).
