= Fifth Army (Bulgaria) =

Пета армия
- Active: 1913; 1941-1945
- Country: Bulgaria
- Allegiance: Bulgarian Army
- Type: Field Army
- Engagements: Second Balkan War; World War II

Commanders
- Notable commanders: Stefan Toshev; Nikola Mikhov

The Bulgarian Fifth Army was a Bulgarian field army during the Second Balkan War and World War II.

== First Formation ==
The Fifth Army was formed in May 1913 under the name of the First Reserve Army, comprising two infantry divisions, the 12th and 13th. Each had 1 artillery brigade, seven infantry regiments, one cavalry brigade, and three border companies. Its commander was Major General Stefan Toshev.
On May 26, the 4th Preslav Infantry Division was included in the Fifth Army in place of the 13th Division.

The Fifth Army fought against the Serbs in Osogovo. It was disbanded on August 22, 1913.

== Second Formation ==
On May 17, 1940, after the outbreak of World War II (1941-1945), the Fifth Covering Army was formed. It was given the task of covering the southwestern border of Bulgaria. After the German conquest of the Balkans, the army was reformed into the Fifth Bulgarian Army with Commander Nikola Mikhov. Its task was to replace German troops as occupation force in Southern Yugoslavia, with its headquarters in Skopje.

At the beginning of September 1944, the Fifth Army (14th, 15th, 17th and 29th Infantry Divisions and the 1st Cavalry Brigade in Macedonia and Southern Serbia) began withdrawing to the old borders of Bulgaria. The withdrawal itself did not take place in an organized manner, and on September 6, the 14th and 29th Infantry Divisions were disarmed by the Germans and ceased to exist as combat-ready units. Only the 17th Infantry Division, which was closest to the old border, managed to withdraw. The 15th Division was the only one to resist and fight the Germans near Bitola and Prilep with the support of the Bulgarian aviation, after which it withdrew in small groups to Bulgaria.

On October 2, 1944, the army was renamed the Sixth Army, and on October 7, 1944, it was disbanded.

== Commanders ==
- Major General Stefan Toshev (May 17, 1913 - August 22, 1913)
- Major General Nikola Mikhov (April 19, 1941 - August 11, 1941)
- Major General Vasil Boydev (August 11, 1941 - May 11, 1944)
- Major General Konstantin Stoyanov (May 11, 1944 - September 6, 1944) (committed suicide)
- Major General Alexander Popdimitrov (September 7, 1944 - September 12, 1944)
- Major General Vladimir Ketskarov (September 12, 1944 - October 7, 1944)
