= Mustafa Hilmi Pasha =

Ottoman general

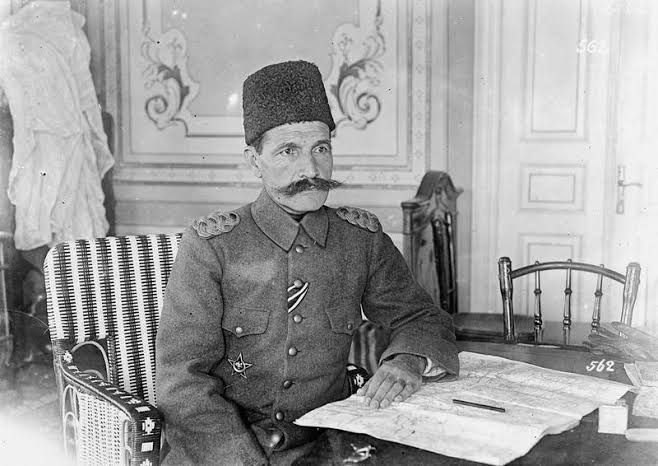
- Mustafa Hilmi Pasha
- Born: 1863; Constantinople, Ottoman Empire
- Died: 1922 (aged 58–59); Istanbul, Turkey
- Military career
- Allegiance: Ottoman Empire; Turkey
- Commands: VI Army Corps
- Conflicts: First World War; Eastern Front; Romania in World War I; Dobruja Campaign; Turkish War of Independence

Mustafa Hilmi Pasha (1863–1922) was a general of the Ottoman Army.

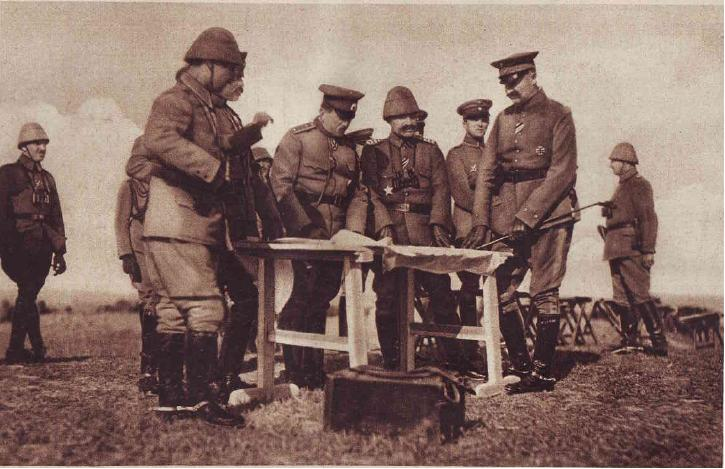
General Toshev and Hilmi Pasha observing the fighting around Medgidia

He was the son of Ibrahim Pasha Sarim. In the early 20th century, he participated in the modernisation and unification of the Ottoman Army.

In World War I, he commanded the VI Army Corps, which was sent to participate in the campaign against Romania during the period October 1916 – February 1918.

In the Turkish War of Independence, he fought against French forces around Gaziantep. He died in 1922 in Istanbul.

== Sources ==
- Ioanițiu, Alexandru (Lt.-Colonel) (1929). Războiului României, 1916-1918. București: Tipografia Geniului.
