= Andrei Zayonchkovski =

Russian and Soviet general (1862–1926)

Andrei Medardovich Zayonchkovsky
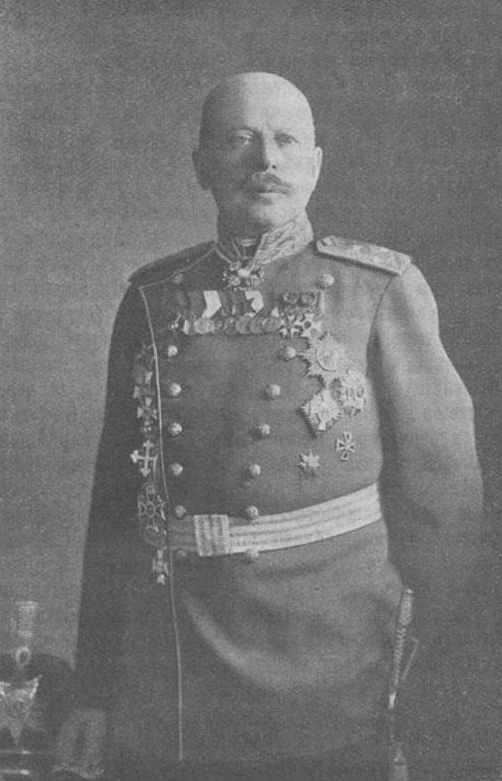
- Born: 20 December [O.S. 8 December] 1862; Oryol, Russian Empire
- Died: 22 March 1926 (aged 63); Moscow, Soviet Union
- Military career
- Allegiance: Russian Empire; Russian SFSR; USSR
- Branch: (Russian Empire) Russian Imperial Army (Russian Soviet Federative Socialist Republic) Red Army
- Rank: General
- Commands: 22nd Infantry Division (Russian Empire); 30th Army Corps (Russian Empire); Dobruja Army
- Conflicts: Russo-Japanese War; World War I; Romanian campaign; Dobruja Campaign; Battle of Bazargic; First Battle of Cobadin; Second Battle of Cobadin; Russian Civil War; Operation Trust

Andrei Medardovich Zayonchkovsky (Russian: Андре́й Меда́рдович Зайончко́вский) (20 December [O.S. 8 December] 1862 – 22 March 1926) commanded the defence of the Romanian-Bulgarian border in Dobruja upon Romania's entry into World War I in August 1916.

== Biography ==
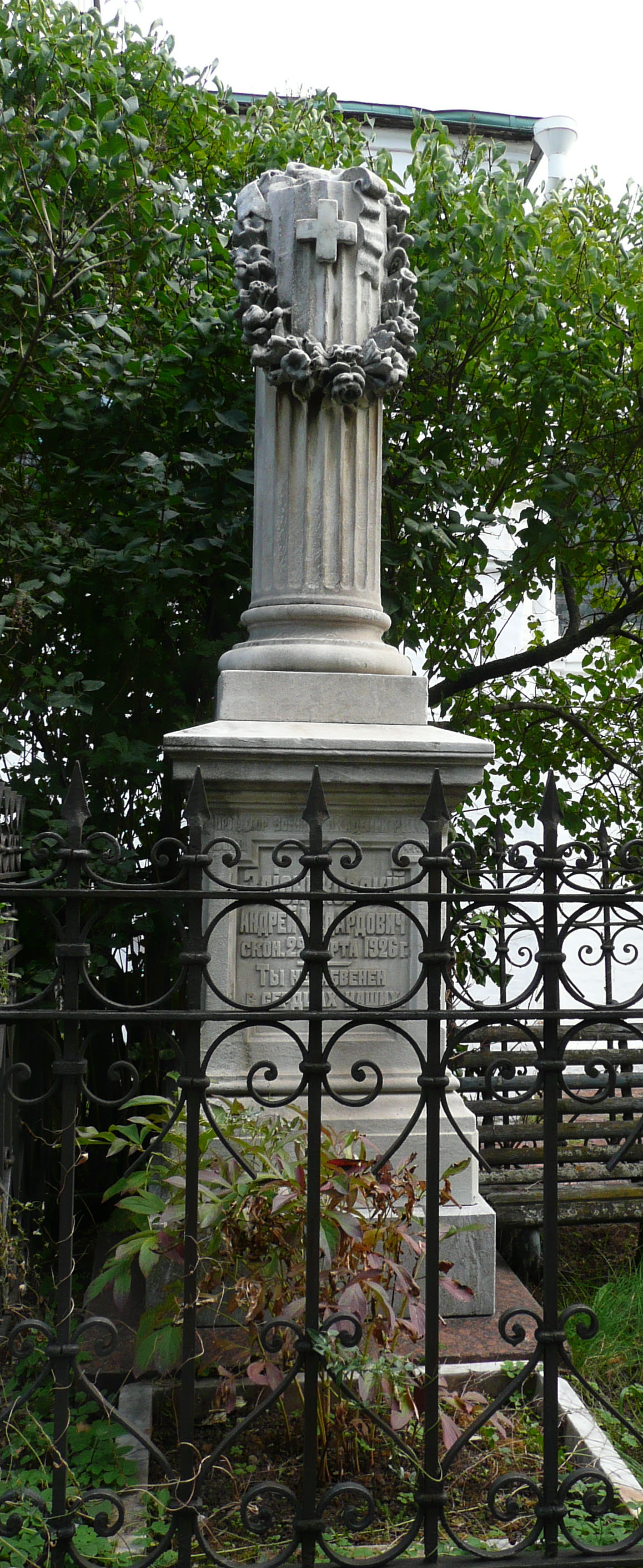
The tomb of Andrei Zayonchkovsky in the Novodevichy Convent

After graduation from the Nicholas School of Military Engineering (Nikolaevskoe Inzhenernoe Uchilishche) in 1882, Zayonchkovsky served in the 5th Sapper Battalion. In 1888 he graduated from the General Staff Academy and served in various staff positions.

During the Russo-Japanese War he commanded the 85th Vyborg Infantry Regiment and the 2nd brigade of the 3rd Siberian Infantry Division.

During World War I Zayonchkovsky commanded first the 30th Army Corps. Following Romania's entry into the war on 27 August 1916, he commanded the Russian-Romanian Dobruja Army in charge of defending Dobruja against the Central Powers. He was relieved by general Dmitry Shcherbachev in April 1917 and was in retirement by the time of the October Revolution.

In 1918 he joined the Red Army, serving in various staff positions. After the end of the Russian Civil War he switched to teaching in the Red Army Military Academy and writing. He wrote a two-volume overview of World War I military operations.

While a professor, "Zayonchkovsky worked as an agent for the Soviet secret police at the same time he was head of the conspiratorial anti-Bolshevik Monarchist Union (The Trust)."

Preceded by Vladimir Apollonovich Olokhov	Commander of the 22nd Infantry Division; 30 May – 30 July 1912	Succeeded by Alexander Alexandrovich Dushkevich
