= Stefan Toshev =

Bulgarian general

- Стефан Тошев
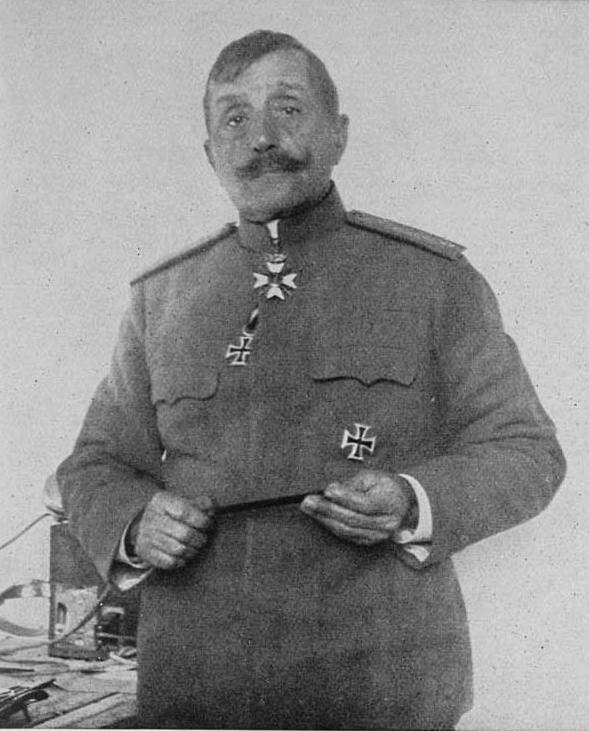
- General Stefan Toshev in 1916
- Born: 18 December 1859; Eski Zagra, Ottoman Empire
- Died: 27 November 1924 (aged 64); Plovdiv, Bulgaria
- Military career
- Allegiance: Bulgaria
- Branch: Bulgarian Army
- Service years: 1878–1919
- Rank: General of the Infantry
- Commands: 1st Sofia Infantry Regiment; 1st Sofia Infantry Division (1908–1913); 5th Army (1913); 3rd Army (1915–1916); 4th Army (1918)
- Conflicts: Russo-Turkish War (1877–1878); Serbo-Bulgarian War; Battle of Slivnitsa; First Balkan War; Bulgarian front; Battle of Kirk Kilisse; Battle of Lule Burgas; First Battle of Çatalca; Second Battle of Çatalca; Second Balkan War; World War I; Dobruja campaign; Battle of Tutrakan; Battle of Dobrich; Second Battle of Cobadin
- Awards

Stefan Toshev (Bulgarian: Стефан Тошев) (18 December 1859 – 27 November 1924) was a Bulgarian General of the Infantry. He served as a volunteer in the Bulgarian Volunteer Corps during the Russo-Turkish War of 1877–1878, later graduating from the Military School in Sofia in 1879 and served in the Eastern Rumelian Militia. During the Serbo-Bulgarian War of 1885, he commanded Bulgarian forces in several engagements, including the fighting at Tran and Tri Ushi. He served as commander of the First Sofia Infantry Division during the First Balkan War and led the Bulgarian Fifth Army during the Second Balkan War. Toshev is best known for commanding the Bulgarian Third Army during the First World War, particularly during the successful Dobruja campaign of 1916. He also took command of the Bulgarian Fourth Army in 1918. After retiring from military service in 1919, he remained active in veterans' organizations and wrote several military history books until his death in Plovdiv in 1924.

== Serbo-Bulgarian War (1885) ==
During the Serbo-Bulgarian War in 1885 Stefan Toshev was a commander of 2nd company of the 3rd Vidin Regiment, and was in charge of the Tran position. He took part in the battle of Slivnitsa, the fight at Tran (3 November), the repulse of the Serbian Morava Division. He fought bravely in the battle of Tri Ushi and the attack of Meka tsrav (7 November). He was awarded with Order For Bravery 4th Class.

Later Toshev was in command of the 1st Sofia Infantry Regiment and in 1908 was appointed as a commander of the 1st Sofia Infantry Division, also known as the Iron division.

== Balkan Wars (1912-1913) ==
During the First Balkan War (1912–1913) Stefan Toshev and his division took part in the offensive of the Bulgarian Army in the Thracian theatre of operation. He participated in the engagements of Gechkenli and Seliolu during the battle of Kirk Kilisse and the attack at Chataldzha. On 5 August 1913 he was promoted Lieutenant General.

During the Second Balkan War he was in command of the 5th Army which successfully fought against the Serbs.

== First World War (1914-1918) ==
During the Bulgarian participation in World War I (1915–1918) General Toshev was in charge of the 3rd Army which routed the Russian-Romanian Army in the Dobruja campaign defeating it in the battles at Tutrakan, Dobrich and Cobadin, but after serious conflicts with the German General August von Mackensen he was replaced with General Stefan Nerezov. Toshev was appointed governor of Macedonia. On 25 March 1917 he was promoted General of the Infantry - the highest military post in Bulgaria.

In 1918 Toshev commanded 4th Army and from June 1919 went into the reserve. Between 1923-1924 he was a chairman of the "Association of the reserve officers". In October 1923 he led the "Narodna Priznatelnost" committee whose aim was to give assistance for the victims of the Communist insurgents during the September Uprising.

General Stefan Toshev died on 27 November 1924 in Plovdiv and was buried in Sofia. One town (General Toshevo) and a village are named after him.

== Sources ==
- Buttar, Prit (2016). Russia's Last Gasp: The Eastern Front 1916–17. Osprey Publishing / Bloomsbury. ISBN 978-1-47281-276-6.
- Nedev, S. (1993). Komandvaneto na balgarskata voyska prez voynite za natsionalno obedinenie [The Command of the Bulgarian Army During the Wars for National Unification] (in Bulgarian). Sofia: Voennoizdatelski kompleks "Sv. Georgi Pobedonosets".
- Vazov, V. (1992). Zhivotopisni belezhki [Biographical Notes] (in Bulgarian). Sofia: Voennoizdatelski kompleks "Sv. Georgi Pobedonosets". ISBN 954-509-002-2.
- Dimitrov, I. (1985). Saedinenieto 1885 - entsiklopedichen spravochnik [The Unification of 1885 - Encyclopedic Reference Book] (in Bulgarian). Sofia: Darzhavno izdatelstvo "Dr. Petar Beron".
- Born a victor, a knight of honour
