= Todor Kantardzhiev =

Bulgarian military officer

Todor Dimitrov Kantardzhiev
- Тодор Кантарджиев
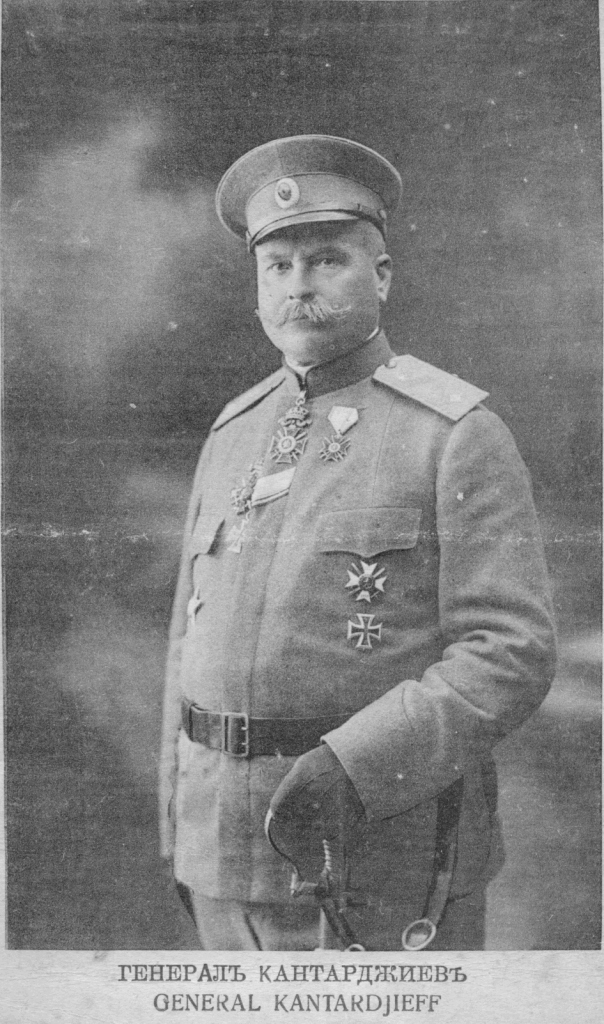
- Born: 10 February 1861; Samokov, Ottoman Empire
- Died: 25 January 1945 (aged 83); Bulgaria
- Military career
- Allegiance: Bulgaria
- Branch: Bulgarian Army
- Service years: 1884–1913, 1915–1917
- Rank: Leytenant General
- Commands: 16th Infantry Regiment; 5th Infantry Division(1913–1914); Cumulative Division(1916–1918)
- Conflicts: Serbo-Bulgarian War; Balkan War; Second Balkan War; World War I
- Awards: Military Order "For Bravery" IV grade 2nd grade Military Order of Courage Grade III Grade 1 (World War I); Iron Cross II class (World War I); Iron Cross 1st Class (World War I); Military Merit Order, Class II, with military decoration, Austro-Hungary (World War I); Likat Order, Ottoman Empire (World War I); Iron Crescent Order, Ottoman Empire (World War I); The Order of St. Alexander “Grade III with swords and Grade IV without swords People's Order " For Military Merit " Grade III with Military Distinction; People's Order of Military Merit I degree with military honors Medal of Merit, Ottoman Empire (May 11, 1917)

Todor Dimitrov Kantardzhiev (10 February 1861 – 4 January 1945) was a Bulgarian lieutenant general and doctor.

== Biography ==
Todor Kantardzhiev was born on 10 February 1861 in Samokov, Ottoman Empire (Now modern Bulgaria) and died on 4 January 1945. On 20 June 1878, he enlisted in military service. In 1884, he graduated from Vasil Levski National Military University in Sofia on 30 August and was promoted to leytenant. Afterwards he was assigned to the 1st Infantry Battalion Sofia.

== War career ==
=== The Serbo-Bulgarian War (1885) ===
Kandardzhiev commanded the 14th company of the 1st Infantry Battalion Sofia throughout the Serbo-Bulgarian War. With his regiment he participated in the defense of Slivnitsa and the Battle of Pirot. After the war ended he was awarded the Order of Courage IV Grade 2 class.

On 30 August 1886, he was promoted to Starshy leytenant. He later commanded the 16th Infantry Regiment the same year. In 1889 he was promoted to Kapitan. In 1893 he graduated from a military academy in Belgium. After his return to Bulgaria he was promoted to Mayor in 1894 then to the rank of Podpolkovnik in 1899. In 1901 he became the former Chief of Staff in the 1st Infantry Division and then became a teacher in military school.

Though Todor Kantardzhiev's military career continued - on 2 August 1903 he was promoted to Polkovnik. In 1904, he commanded the 1st Brigade and the 9th Infantry Division in Pleven, and from 1909 he commanded the 2nd Brigade and the 2nd Infantry Division in Thracian for a little while.

=== The Balkan Wars (1912-13) ===
During the Balkan War Kantardzhiev commanded the 1st brigade of the 6th "Bdin" Infantry Division (bg) and participated in the battles of Kirk Kilisse, Lule Burgas and Çatalca. During the Second Balkan War, it fought at the Macedonian Military Theater - at Strumica, Pechchevo, and Mount Ruen.

After the war, Colonel Kantardzhiev commanded the 5th Infantry Division from 1913 to 1914, then on 14 February 1914 he was promoted to General-mayor.

=== World War I ===
At the beginning of the First World War Kantardzhiev was re-mobilized and in September 1915 and was appointed Chief of the rear management of the Third Bulgarian Army. In 1916 he became head of the Varna Fortress.

On August 27, 1916, Romania declares war on Austria-Hungary, for its part, Bulgaria, as an ally, declares war on Romania on September 1, 1916. With the units it collected, Kantardzhiev formed the right wing of the 3rd Army which later became the basis of the newly formed Combined Division. Under his command, the division conducted multiple military operations at the mouth of the Danube. It became famous for the release of Dobrich from Romanian occupation. Following the surrender of Romania in 1917, him and his unit were stationed on the Macedonian Front.

== Military Promotion History ==
- Private (1878)
- Corporal (1878)
- NCO (1879)
- Feldfebel (1879)
- Second Lieutenant (30 August 1884)
- Lieutenant (August 30, 1886)
- Captain (1889)
- Major (1894)
- Lieutenant Colonel (1899)
- Colonel (2 August 1903)
- Major General (February 14, 1914)
- Lieutenant General (15 August 1917)

== Awards ==
- Military Order "For Bravery" IV grade 2 nd grade
- Military Order of Courage Grade III Grade 1 (World War I)
- Iron Cross II class (World War I)
- Iron Cross 1st Class (World War I)
- Military Merit Order, Class II, with military decoration, Austro-Hungary (World War I)
- Likat Order, Ottoman Empire (World War I)
- Iron Crescent Order, Ottoman Empire (World War I)
- The Order of St. Alexander “Grade III with swords and Grade IV without swords
- People's Order " For Military Merit " Grade III with Military Distinction
- People's Order of Military Merit I degree with military honors
- Medal of Merit, Ottoman Empire (May 11, 1917)

== Sources ==
- Kantardzhiev, T., The Dobrich Epic, Sofia, 1926. 224 p., 1 k.
- Nedev, S., The Command of the Bulgarian Army during the National Unity Wars, Sofia, 1993, Military Publishing Complex "St. Georgi Pobedonosets", pp. 173 - 174
- Stefan Stefanov. "From Slivnitsa to Serret, from sergeant to commander"
- Rumenin, Rumen. Officers Corps in Bulgaria 1878 - 1944 Vol. 3 and 4. Sofia, Publishing House of the Ministry of Defense "St. George the Winner", 1996.
- Yotov, Petko, Dobrev, Angel, Milenov, Blagoy. The Bulgarian Army in the First World War (1915 - 1918): A brief encyclopedic reference book. Sofia, St. George the Winner, 1995.

== See also ==
- General Kantardzhievo - a village named after the general.
- Fourth Army (Bulgaria)
- Bulgarian Armed Forces
