= Eastern Front (World War I) =

East European theater of World War I

- Part of the European theatre of World War I
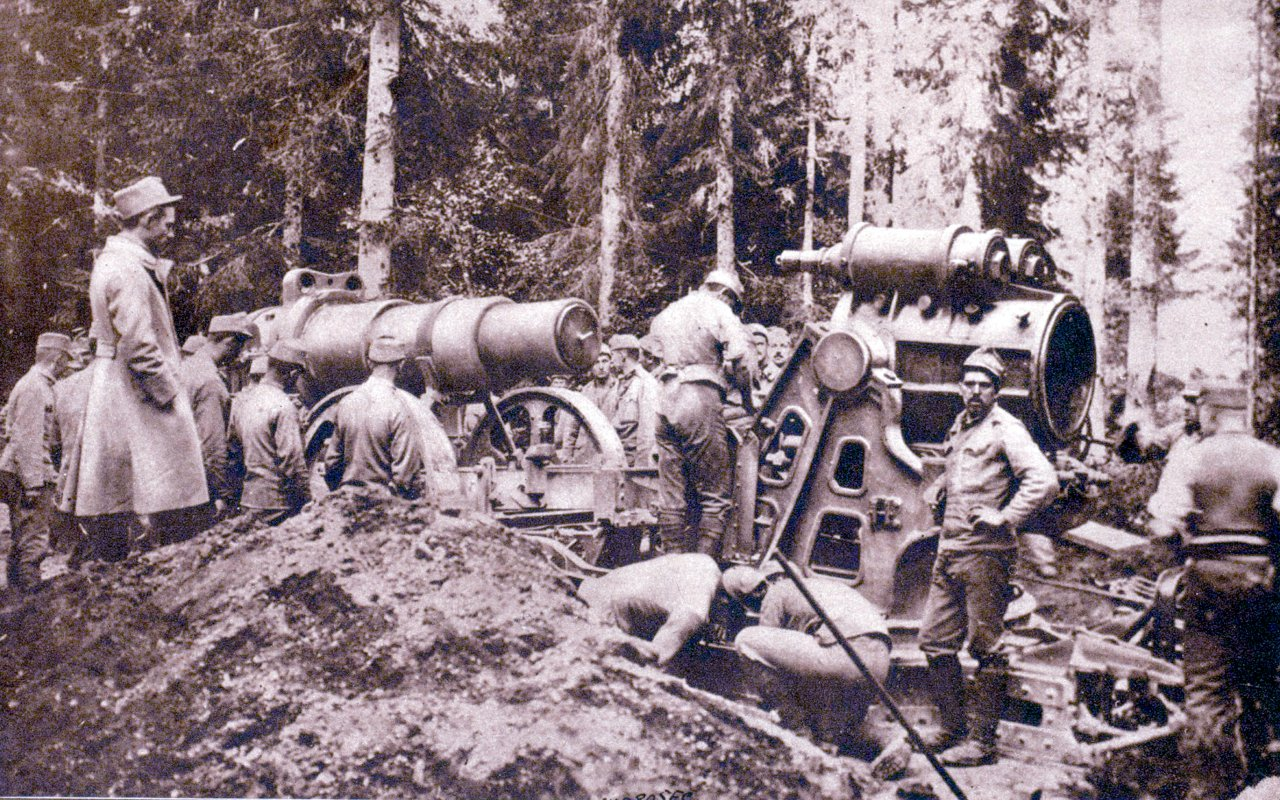
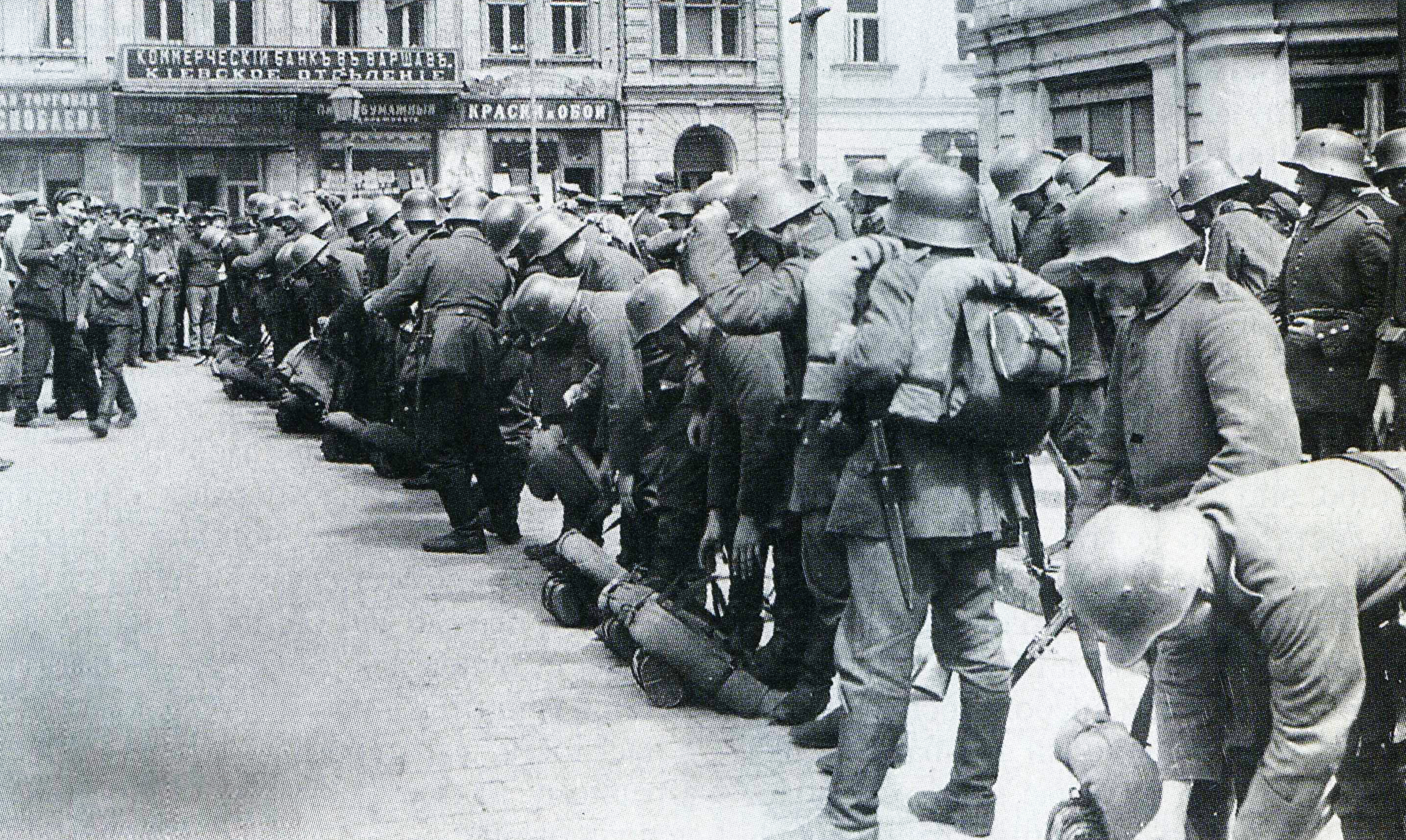
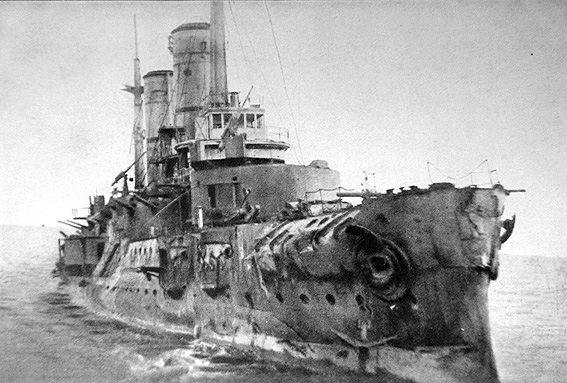
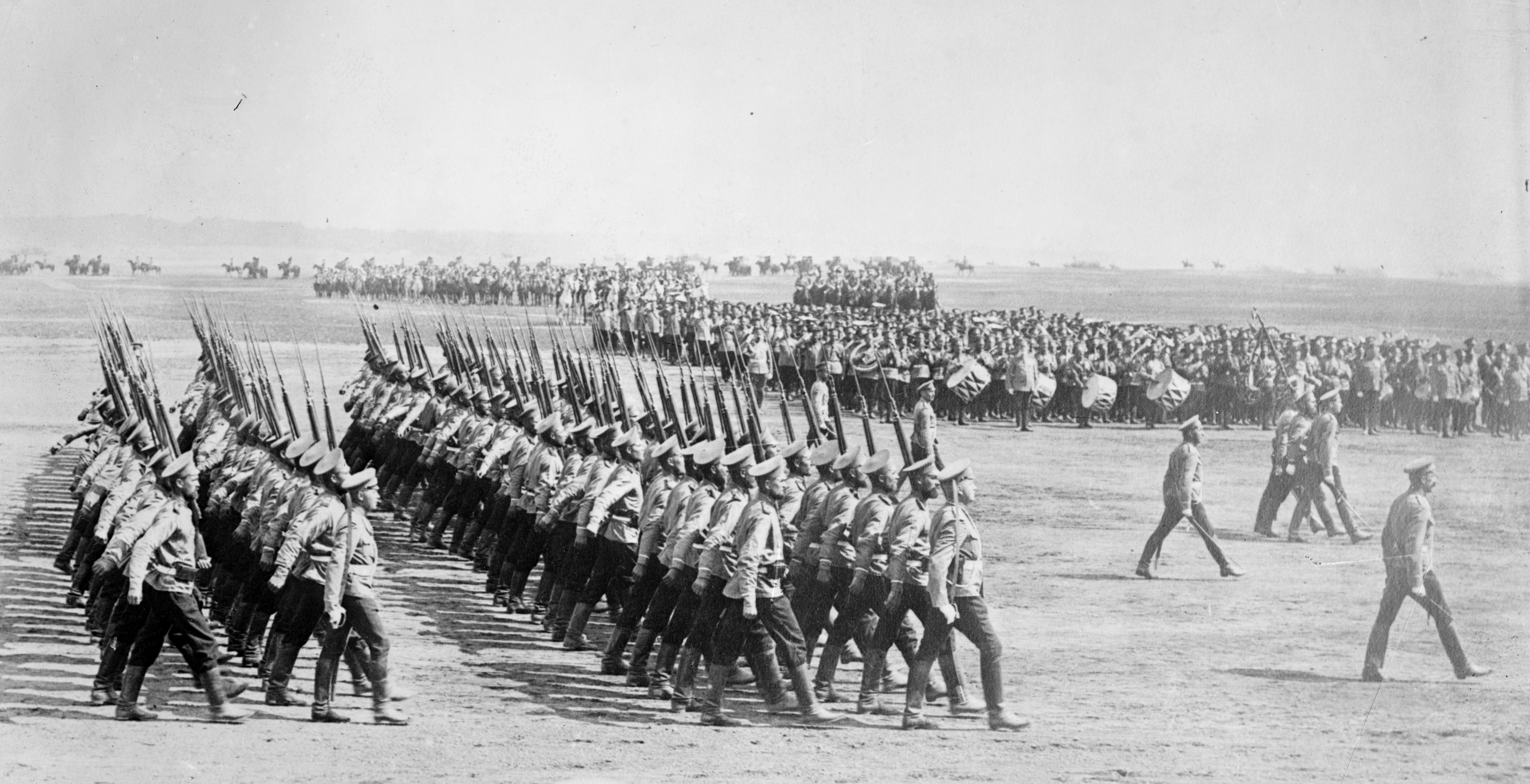
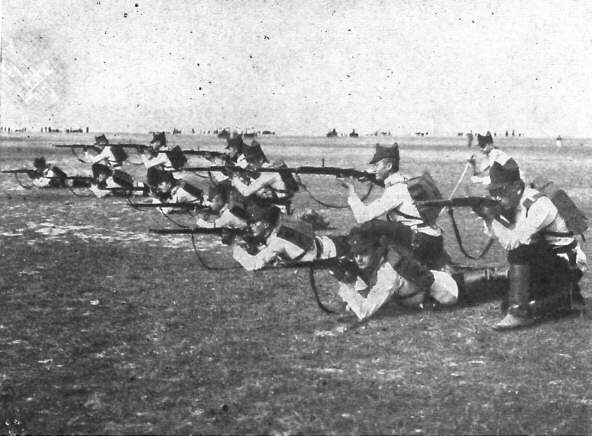
- Clockwise from top left: soldiers stationed in the Carpathian Mountains, 1915; German soldiers in Kiev, March 1918; the Russian ship Slava, October 1917; Russian infantry, 1914; Romanian infantry
Date	1 August 1914 – 3 March 1918
Location	Central and Eastern Europe
Result	Central Powers victory (Note: Attributed to the following sources: Pearson, Raymond (2014). The Longman Companion to European Nationalism 1789-1920. Routledge. p. 15. ISBN 9781317897774. "Cheered by the Central Powers' victory on, then dissolution of, the eastern front, Germany finds herself fighting on one front for the first time."; Weinhauer, Klaus; McElligott, Anthony; Heinsohn, Kirsten (2015). Germany 1916-23: A Revolution in Context. transcript Verlag. p. 159. ISBN 9783839427347. "The defeat of Russia gave Ludendorff only a small window of opportunity in order to concentrate military forces in France prior to an inevitable flood of fresh American troops."; Kramer, Alan (7 November 2008). Dynamic of Destruction: Culture and Mass Killing in the First World War. OUP Oxford. p. 268. ISBN 978-0-19-156250-1. "The end of the war came in several stages in 1918. The first stage was a German victory in the east, crowned by the Treaty of Brest-Litovsk of 3 March 1918."; Tucker, Spencer C. (28 October 2014). World War I: The Definitive Encyclopedia and Document Collection [5 volumes]. Bloomsbury Publishing USA. ISBN 979-8-216-16870-6. "The Treaty of Brest Livotsk, which was essentially forced upon the Russians by Germany, was a major humiliation for the Russians. In March 1917 Czar Nicholas II of Russia was overthrown, the result of the terrible cost of World War I to Russia."; Pares, Sir Bernard; Seton-Watson, Robert William; Williams, Harold; Jopson, Norman Brooke (1969). Slavonic (and East European) Review ... p. 320. "Great Western democracies secured a decisive victory in the so-called World War, their Eastern ally, the old Russian Empire, lost the war"; Legvold, Robert (2007). Russian Foreign Policy in the Twenty-First Century and the Shadow of the Past. Columbia University Press. p. 209. ISBN 978-0-231-51217-6. "Russia's defeat in the First World War and the intervention stripped Russia of its imperial borderlands and reduced the core to the frontiers of 1618."; Cecil, Hugh; Liddle, Peter (1998). At the Eleventh Hour: Reflections, Hopes and Anxieties at the Closing of the Great War, 1918. Pen and Sword Books. p. 321. ISBN 978-1-78383-992-6. "These were all areas ceded to the Germans in the punitive treaty of Brest-Litovsk in March 1918. Russia, too, thus paid the price for defeat.")

Belligerents
Central Powers: Germany; Austria-Hungary; Ottoman Empire (1916–17); Bulgaria (1916–17)	Allied Powers: Russia (Note: Russian Empire during 1914–17, Russian Provisional Government and Republic during 1917.) (1914–17); Romania (1916–17); Serbia (1914–16); Belgium (1915–17); United Kingdom (1916–17); France (1916–17); (Russian Socialist Federative Soviet Republic) Soviet Russia (1917–18)

Commanders and leaders
Paul von Hindenburg; Erich Ludendorff; Leopold of Bavaria; Max Hoffmann; Conrad von Hötzendorf; Arthur Arz von Straußenburg; Enver Pasha; Cevat Pasha; Yakup Şevki Pasha; Hilmi Pasha; Nikola Zhekov	Nicholas II; Grand Duke Nicholas; Mikhail Alekseyev; Aleksei Brusilov; Lavr Kornilov; Constantin Prezan; Nikolai Krylenko

Units involved
Units: East Prussia; (German Empire) 8th Army; (German Empire) 10th Army; Poland; (German Empire) 9th Army; (Austria-Hungary) 1st Army; (Poland) Polish Legionnaires; Galicia; (Austria-Hungary) 2nd Army; (Austria-Hungary) 3rd Army; (Austria-Hungary) 4th Army; (German Empire) 11th Army; (Ottoman Empire) XV Corps; Ukrainian People's Army (1918); Romania; (German Empire) 9th Army; (German Empire) Danube Army; (Austria-Hungary) 1st Army; (Tsardom of Bulgaria (1908–1946)) 3rd Army; (Ottoman Empire) VI Corps Naval units German Navy (Baltic Sea) Constantinople Flotilla Ottoman Navy (Black Sea) (Austria-Hungary) Danube Flotilla	Units: Northern Front; 1st Army; 5th Army; 6th Army; 12th Army; Western Front; 2nd Army; 10th Army; Special Army; Southwestern Front; 3rd Army; 4th Army; 7th Army; 11th Army; Romanian Front; 4th Army; 6th Army; 8th Army; 9th Army; (Kingdom of Romania) 2nd Army; (Kingdom of Romania) 1st Army (Kingdom of Romania) 4th Army (Kingdom of Romania) 3rd Army (Bohemia) Czechoslovak Legions (Kingdom of Serbia) 1st Serbian Division (Belgium) Expeditionary Corps (United Kingdom of Great Britain and Ireland) Expeditionary Force (French Third Republic) French Military Mission Naval units (Russian Empire) Baltic Fleet (Russian Empire) Black Sea Fleet Black Sea Fleet Danube Flotilla (United Kingdom of Great Britain and Ireland) Baltic Submarine Flotilla

Strength
October 1917 1,178,600 infantry 39,000 cavalry 1,690 light guns 2,230 heavy guns	October 1917 2,166,700 infantry 110,600 cavalry 1,226 light guns 1,139 heavy guns

Casualties and losses
1,612,089: 317,118 dead 1,151,153 wounded 143,818 captured 4,377,000–4,801,000: 726,000–1,150,000 dead 2,172,000 wounded 1,479,289 captured 45,000: 8,000 dead 22,000 wounded 10,000 captured 30,250 Total: 5,952,000–6,452,000+ casualties: 1,038,000–1,458,000 dead	6,800,000–9,000,000+ See casualties section 535,700: 335,706 dead 120,000 wounded 80,000 captured (Kingdom of Serbia) 10,000: 1,939 dead 9,000 wounded Total: ~7,345,700–9,610,000+ casualties: 1,112,645–2,592,039 dead
- Civilian deaths: 2,000,000+ Russian Empire: 410,000 civilians died due to military action 730,000 civilians died of war-related causes Kingdom of Romania: 130,000 civilians died due to military action 200,000 civilians died of war-related causes Austria-Hungary: 120,000 civilians died due to military action 467,000 civilians died of war-related causes

The Eastern Front, or Eastern Theater, of World War I (Note: Other names: German: Ostfront; Romanian: Frontul de răsărit), for Russia Second Patriotic War (Russian: Вторая Отечественная Война, romanized: Vtoraya Otechestvennaya Voyna)) was a theater of operations that encompassed at its greatest extent the entire frontier between Russia and Romania on one side and Austria-Hungary, Bulgaria, the Ottoman Empire, and Germany on the other. It ranged from the Baltic Sea in the north to the Black Sea in the south, involved most of Eastern Europe, and stretched deep into Central Europe. The term contrasts with the Western Front, which was being fought in Belgium and France. Unlike the static warfare on the Western Front, the fighting on the geographically larger Eastern Front was more dynamic, often involving the flanking and encirclement of entire formations, and resulted in over 100,000 square miles of territory becoming occupied by a foreign power.

At the start of the war Russia launched offensives against both Germany and Austria-Hungary that were meant to achieve a rapid victory. The invasion of East Prussia was completely defeated while the advance into Austria-Hungary stalled in the Carpathians, and following successful offensives by the Central Powers in 1915 its gains were reversed. Germany and Austria-Hungary defeated Russian forces in Galicia and Poland, causing Russia to abandon the Polish salient, parts of Belarus and the Baltic region, and Galicia. However, the campaigns of 1914–15 also failed to achieve Germany's objective of taking Russia out of the war, and by 1916 Germany prioritized its resources for winning in the West.

Russia went on the offensive to take pressure off France at the Battle of Verdun: its attack near Lake Naroch in early 1916 was quickly defeated by Germany, but the Brusilov offensive that summer became the largest Entente victory in the war. Russia inflicted over one million casualties on Austria-Hungary and forced Germany to redeploy divisions from the Western Front, at the cost of its own heavy losses. In August 1916 Romania entered the war but was quickly overrun by Germany, though Russia helped prevent a total Romanian collapse. The events of the February Revolution in March [O.S. February] 1917, caused by food shortages in Russian cities, began a decline in discipline among the troops.

After the abdication of Emperor Nicholas II, the Russian Provisional Government chose to continue the war to fulfill its obligations to the Entente. In July 1917 Russia's last offensive of the war ended in failure, and in September, Germany captured Riga, bringing the German Army closer to the Russian capital. This was followed by a military coup attempt that weakened the Provisional Government. The Bolsheviks overthrew the Russian Republic in the October Revolution of November [O.S. October] 1917. Despite the political instability, the majority of the Russian Army was still intact and stayed at the front line until early 1918, though the Bolsheviks began taking steps to dissolve it in December 1917 while maintaining some forces against the Central Powers as their negotiations were ongoing.

The new Soviet government established by the Bolsheviks signed the Treaty of Brest-Litovsk with the Central Powers in March 1918 after Operation Faustschlag, taking Russia out of the war; leading to a Central Powers victory. However, the Western Entente soon defeated the Central Powers, with the Treaty of Brest-Litovsk being annulled by the Armistice of 11 November 1918. Romania and the Central Powers signed a separate peace treaty on 7 May 1918, but it was canceled by Romania on 10 November 1918.

== Background ==
The assassination of Archduke Franz Ferdinand eventually led to Austria-Hungary's ultimatum to Serbia on 23 July 1914 with German backing, and after the Serbian response to it was rejected, Austria-Hungary declared war against Serbia on 28 July. Russia had made a decision to support Serbia and defend its interests in the Balkans before that, and on 29 July Russian emperor Nicholas II ordered a partial mobilization of the Russian Army in the military districts that bordered Austria. The following day he was convinced by his advisors to order a full mobilization to follow the military's existing mobilization schedule.

Nicholas hoped Germany would see this as a regional conflict between Russia and Austria, but because their war plans depended on taking advantage of Russia's slower mobilization speed, and due to the position of both countries, they felt pressure to go to war immediately. Austria-Hungary began full mobilization on 31 July, and Germany declared war on Russia on 1 August 1914.

=== Russia ===
Russia's plan at the outbreak of war was known as Schedule 19. Approved by Emperor Nicholas II in July 1910 and amended over the next two years, the plan concentrated Russia's armies on its western border with Germany and Austria-Hungary and was initially defensive. The original Schedule 19 would have had the Russian Army mobilize its troops to locations that were a significant distance away from its western border and leave the entire Polish salient to be defended by local fortresses and the Warsaw garrison. Under this version Russia would not have taken any offensive action and would have waited to react to movements by Germany and Austria-Hungary. The defensive nature of Russian planning went back to the military reforms in the 1860s following the Crimean War and was also influenced by the limited capacity of Russia's railway network to facilitate the quick mobilization of troops, though that was gradually improving.

Russian strategy remained this way until developments that took place starting in 1911, when the Chief of Staff of the French Army visited Russia and asked the Russian high command to plan for an immediate offensive if war with Germany broke out to help prevent them from capturing Paris. This was also in accordance with Russia's 1892 promise to attack Germany if France was invaded in order to open a second front. In 1912 the Russian chief of staff, Yakov Zhilinsky, told the French that Russia would go on the offensive against Germany fifteen days after the start of its mobilization. By this point, the improvements in Russia's infrastructure made this a lot more feasible, and there was also domestic pressure for Russia to not abandon its borderlands to foreign occupation. In 1911 new proposals for modifying Schedule 19 were made by army officers, with the most notable among them being Quartermaster-General Yuri Danilov's argument for going on the offensive against both Germany and Austria-Hungary.

In early 1912, the Russian high command decided on a variant of the plan known as Schedule 19A, in which two Russian armies would invade East Prussia while four armies would invade Galicia. This did not give Russia the decisive advantage in either location, but it tried to balance the need for Russia to support France by attacking Germany while also acknowledging that the main interest of Russian foreign policy was in the Balkans. The plan also meant that Russia would begin its offensive before its army was fully mobilized, but it was believed that this was a necessary risk, because there would be a limited amount of time to attack Germany in support of France. The adoption of Schedule 19A in 1912 marked the first time in decades that Russian war planning was primarily offensive.

=== Germany ===
Prior to the outbreak of war, German strategy was based on the Schlieffen Plan. With the Franco-Russian Agreement in place from the early 1890s, Germany knew that war with either of these combatants would result in war with the other, which meant that there would be a two-front war in both the west and the east. Therefore, the German General Staff, led by Alfred von Schlieffen from 1891 to 1906, developed a plan that called for German armies to pass through Belgium and then turn south to quickly capture Paris, while a smaller German force would pin down the French defenders along the Franco-German border. With France being defeated before Russia could fully mobilize, Germany could then turn its focus on Russia, which Schlieffen believed would not be taken out of the war as quickly because of its much larger territory. The Schlieffen Plan was actually a change from his predecessor in the 1880s, Helmuth von Moltke the Elder, who believed that Germany should first be on the defensive in the west and coordinate with Austria to defeat Russia.

Schlieffen's successor at the General Staff, Helmuth von Moltke the Younger, maintained the basic plan that Schlieffen put forward in 1905 of quickly knocking out France in the west before turning to focus on Russia, thereby avoiding a two-front war. This strategy was fully adopted by the German government in 1913. But the plan did not take into account that the growing military capabilities of Russia in the years since the Russo-Japanese War meant that the Russian mobilization would proceed faster than Schlieffen had originally thought. Another problem with the German strategy was the deliberate choice to not coordinate it with their allies in Austria-Hungary. Moltke the Younger wanted Austria to assist Germany by going on the offensive against Russia in the early stages of the war, and never told his Austrian counterpart, Franz Conrad von Hötzendorf, that Germany was not going have its own offensive in the east. Conrad, for his part, was also misleading the Germans by allowing them to think Austria would prioritize an attack against Russia, when he actually planned to focus the Austro-Hungarian offensive power against Serbia.

Conversely, the Imperial German Navy believed it could be victorious over Britain with Russian neutrality, something which Moltke knew would not be possible.

=== Austria-Hungary ===
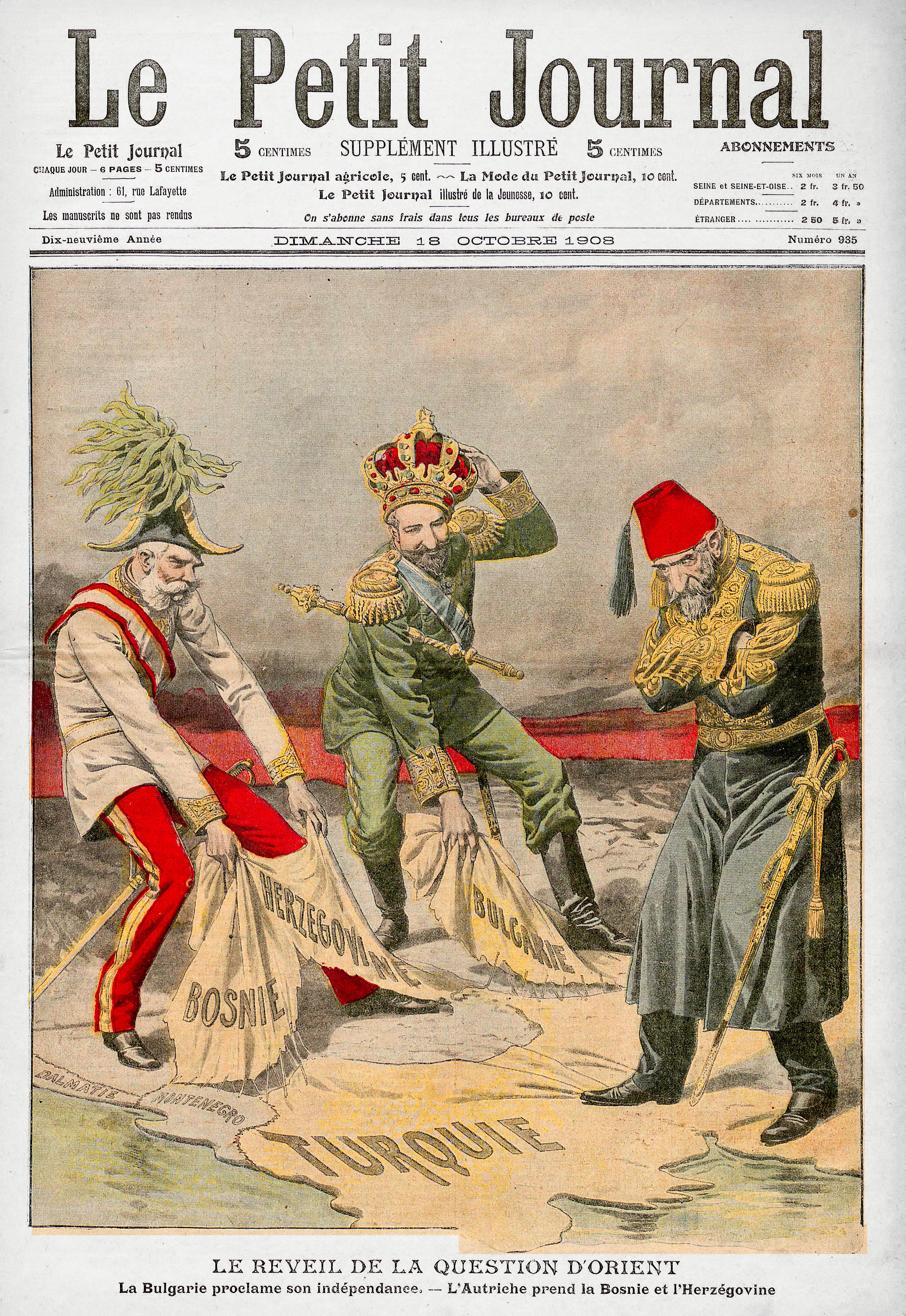
Illustration from the French magazine Le Petit Journal on the Bosnian Crisis. Bulgaria declares its independence and its prince Ferdinand is named Tsar. Austria-Hungary, in the person of Emperor Francis Joseph, annexes Bosnia and Herzegovina, while the Ottoman Sultan Abdul Hamid II looks on helplessly.

Austria-Hungary's participation in the outbreak of World War I has been neglected by historians, as emphasis has traditionally been placed on Germany's role as the prime instigator. However, the "spark" that ignited the First World War is attributed to the assassination of Archduke Franz Ferdinand by Gavrilo Princip, which took place on 28 June 1914. Approximately a month later, on 28 July 1914, Austria-Hungary declared war on Serbia. This act led to a series of events that would quickly expand into the First World War; thus, the Habsburg government in Vienna initiated the pivotal decision that would begin the conflict.

The causes of the Great War have generally been defined in diplomatic terms, but certain deep-seated issues in Austria-Hungary undoubtedly contributed to the beginnings of the First World War. The Austro-Hungarian situation in the Balkans pre-1914 is a primary factor in its involvement in the war. The movement towards South Slav unity was a major problem for the Habsburg Empire, which was facing increasing nationalist pressure from its multinational populace. As Europe's third largest state, the Austro-Hungarian monarchy was hardly homogeneous; comprising over fifty million people and eleven nationalities, the Empire was a conglomeration of a number of diverse cultures, languages, and peoples.

Specifically, the South Slavic people of Austria-Hungary desired to amalgamate with Serbia in an effort to officially solidify their shared cultural heritage. Over seven million South Slavs lived inside the Empire, while three million lived outside it. With the growing emergence of nationalism in the twentieth century, unity of all South Slavs looked promising. This tension is exemplified by Conrad von Hötzendorf's letter to Franz Ferdinand:

The unification of the South Slav race is one of the powerful national movements which can neither be ignored nor kept down. The question can only be, whether unification will take place within the boundaries of the Monarchy – that is at the expense of Serbia's independence – or under Serbia's leadership at the expense of the Monarchy. The cost to the Monarchy would be the loss of its South Slav provinces and thus of almost its entire coastline. The loss of territory and prestige would relegate the Monarchy to the status of a small power.

The annexation of Bosnia-Herzegovina in 1908 by Austrian foreign minister Baron von Aehrenthal in an effort to assert domination over the Balkans inflamed Slavic nationalism and angered Serbia. Bosnia-Herzegovina became a "rallying cry" for South Slavs, with hostilities between Austria-Hungary and Serbia steadily increasing. The situation was ripe for conflict, and when the Serbian nationalist Gavrilo Princip assassinated Austrian imperial heir, Franz Ferdinand, these longstanding hostilities culminated in an all-out war.

The Allied Powers wholeheartedly supported the Slavs' nationalistic fight. George Macaulay Trevelyan, a British historian, saw Serbia's war against Austria-Hungary as a "war of liberation" that would "free South Slavs from tyranny." In his own words: "If ever there was a battle for freedom, there is such a battle now going on in Southeastern Europe against Austrian and Magyar. If this war ends in the overthrow of the Magyar tyranny, an immense step forward will have been taken toward racial liberty and European peace."

=== Ottoman Empire ===
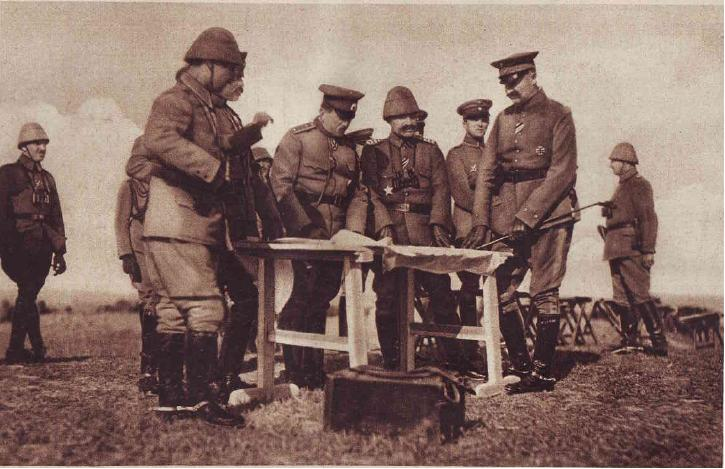
General Toshev and Hilmi Pasha observing the fighting around Medgidia.

The Ottoman Empire entered World War I in October 1914, significantly expanding the Eastern Front to encompass both the Black Sea and the Caucasus. Driven by the secret German–Ottoman alliance signed on 2 August 1914, the Ottoman leadership aimed to curb Russian ambitions regarding the Turkish straits and reclaim territories lost during the Russo-Turkish War (1877–1878).

The formal casus belli occurred on 29 October 1914, when the battlecruiser Yavuz Sultan Selim and cruiser Midilli—both under Ottoman command—bombarded Russian ports, including Sevastopol and Odessa. This forced the Imperial Russian Army to divert substantial forces from Galicia and East Prussia to the Caucasus, overstretching Russian logistics. Later in the conflict, the deployment of the Ottoman XV Corps to Galicia (1916–1917) and the VI Corps to Romania further integrated Ottoman operations into the broader Eastern Front theater.

Prior to the deployment of Ottoman troops following the Russian Brusilov offensive in August 1916, the disposition of German army groups stood as follows:

The German General Staff retained operational command over the Eastern, Western, and Balkan Front Army Groups, while the Austro-Hungarian General Staff commanded the Italian Front and the Crown Prince Karl Army Group. The latter comprised the German South Army alongside the Austro-Hungarian 3rd and 7th Armies. The Ottoman XV Corps was integrated into the South Army under General Graf von Bothmer, which also included the 9th Corps, the Hofmann Corps, the 6th Corps, the 12th Corps, and the 48th Reserve Division.

The XV Corps was initially intended for the Linsingen Army Group in the Kovel sector, but upon arriving in Galicia, it was reassigned to the South Army. Although a reassignment to the Bernhardi Group was considered in July 1916, the deteriorating Austro-Hungarian situation in Galicia dictated otherwise. Contemporary sources provide limited details on the exact operational status within the German South Army's sector immediately before the arrival of the 15th Corps.

The Galician sector saw heavy fighting in June, as the Austro-Hungarian 2nd and 3rd Armies were forced back along a 300 km front stretching from Lodz to Czernowitz during the Brusilov Offensive. In contrast, General von Bothmer’s German South Army successfully held its positions alongside the retreating Austro-Hungarian formations.

As the backbone of the Austro-Hungarian front, the South Army's line was critical; a breakthrough there risked a total collapse of the front. Reinforcements were urgently required, making the assignment of the newly arrived 15th Ottoman Corps to the South Army an operational necessity. For combat purposes, the XV Corps served under the tactical command of the German and Austro-Hungarian headquarters, receiving its ammunition, equipment, and logistics through these combined channels, while maintaining administrative ties with its parent command.

=== Romania ===
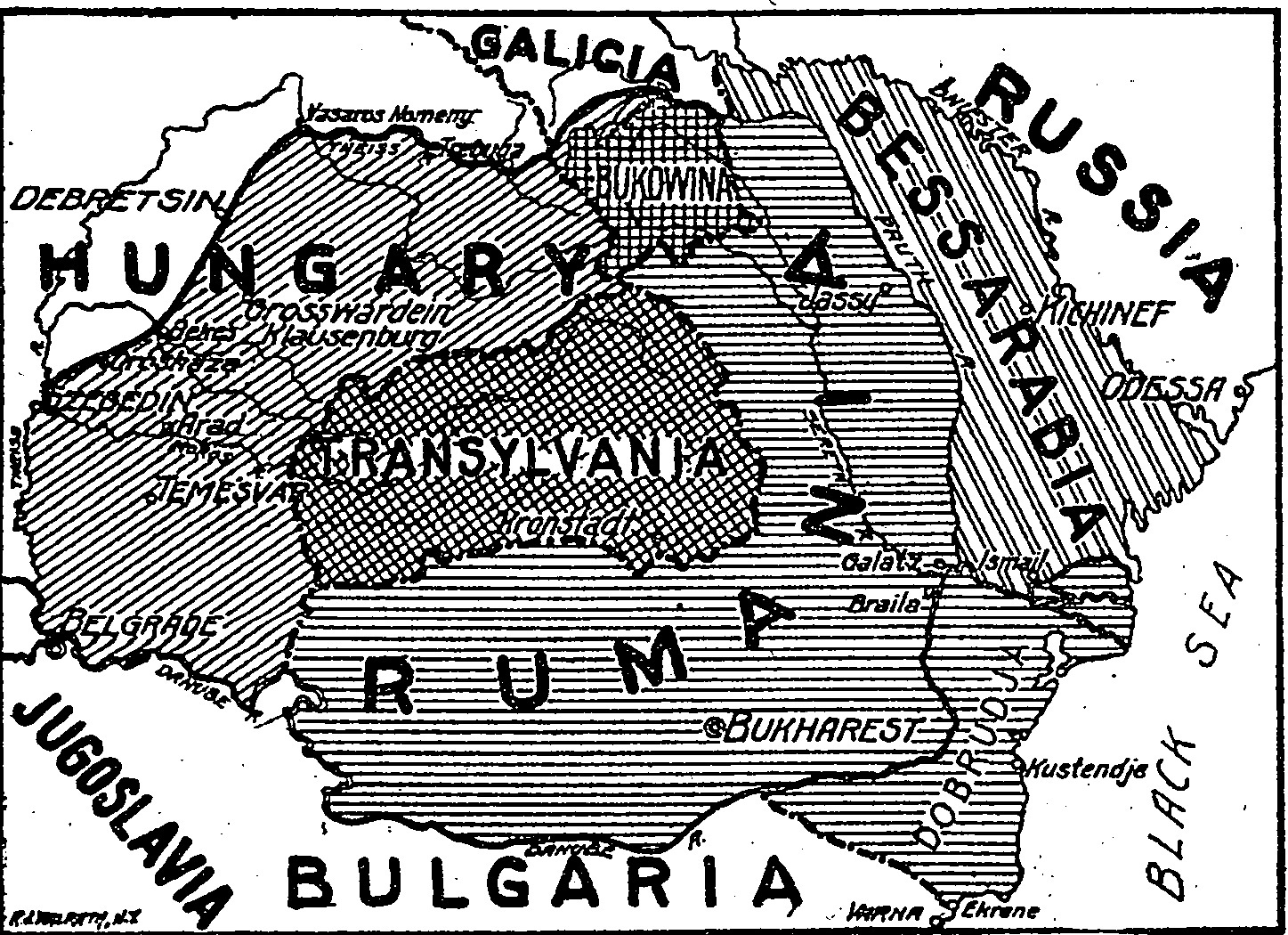
Border changes in favor of Romania as stipulated in the Treaty of Bucharest

In the immediate years preceding the First World War, the Kingdom of Romania was involved in the Second Balkan War on the side of Serbia, Montenegro, Greece and the Ottoman Empire against Bulgaria. The Treaty of Bucharest, signed on 10 August 1913, ended the Balkan conflict and added 6,960 square kilometers to Romania's territory. Although militarized, Romania decided upon a policy of neutrality at the start of the First World War, mainly due to having territorial interests in both Austria-Hungary (Transylvania and Bukovina) and in Russia (Bessarabia). Strong cultural influences also affected Romanian leanings, however. King Carol I, as a Hohenzollern-Sigmaringen, favoured his Germanic roots, while the Romanian people, influenced by their Orthodox church and Latin-based language, were inclined to join France.

Perhaps King Carol's attempts at joining the war on the side of the Central powers would have been fruitful had he not died in 1914, but Romanian disenchantment with Austria-Hungary had already influenced public and political opinion. French endorsement of Romanian action against Bulgaria, and support of the terms of the Treaty of Bucharest was particularly effective at inclining Romania towards the Entente. Furthermore, Russian courting of Romanian sympathies, exemplified by the visit of the Tsar to Constanța on 14 June 1914, signaled in a new era of positive relations between the two countries.

Nevertheless, King Ferdinand I of Romania maintained a policy of neutrality, intending to gain the most for Romania by negotiating between competing powers. The result of the negotiations with the Entente was the Treaty of Bucharest (1916), which stipulated the conditions under which Romania agreed to join the war on the side of the Entente, particularly territorial promises in Austria-Hungary: Transylvania, Crișana and Maramureș, the whole Banat and most of Bukovina. According to historian John Keegan, these enticements offered by the Allies were never concrete, for in secret, Russia and France agreed not to honor any conventions when the end of the war came.

== 1914 ==
In the years prior to 1914, Austro-Russian co-operation was both crucial for European peace and difficult to maintain. Old suspicions exacerbated by the Bosnian crisis stood in the way of agreement between the two empires, as did ethnic sensitivities.

The Russian military was the largest in the world, consisting of 1,400,000 men. They could also mobilize up to 5 million men but only had 4.6 million rifles to give them. Russian troops were satisfactorily supplied at the beginning of the war; there was more light artillery than France, and no less than Germany.

=== Initial engagements ===
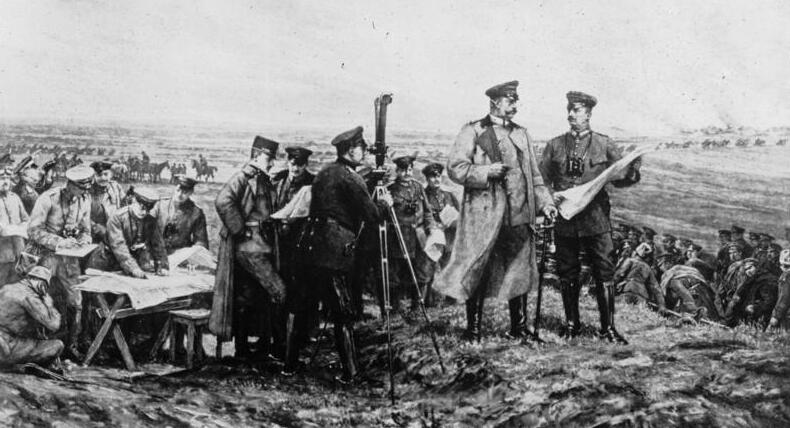
Hindenburg at Tannenberg, by Hugo Vogel.

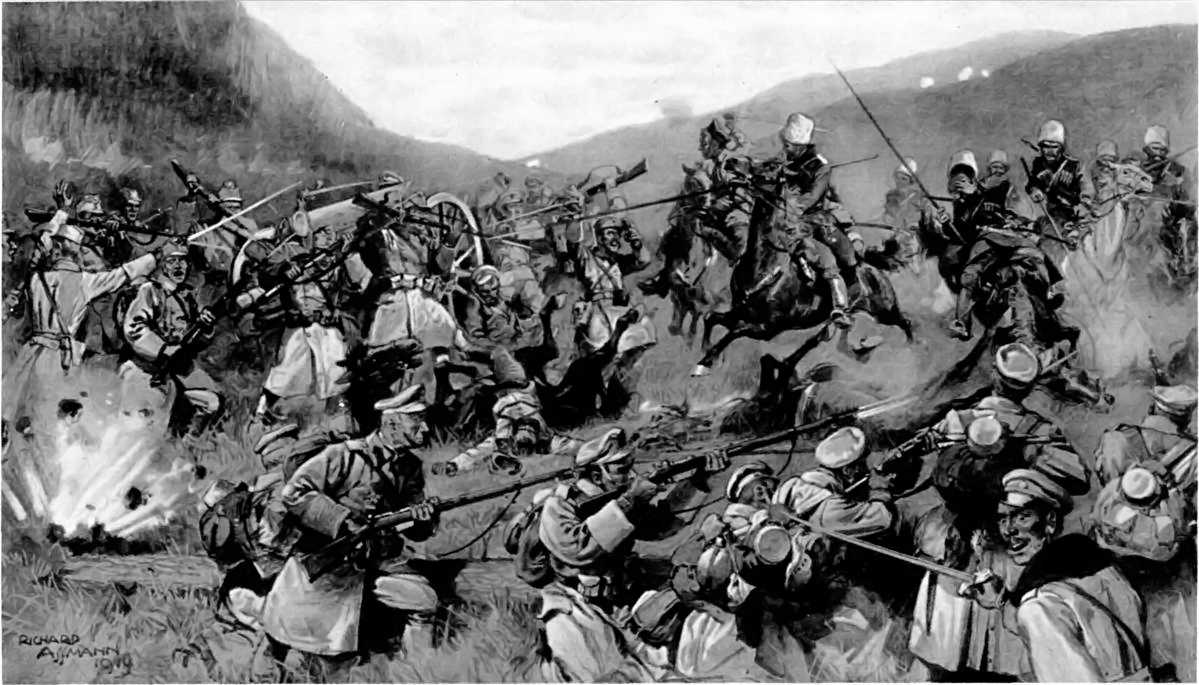
An engagement in Hungary

The first events were the capture of Kalish and Chenhostov by the Germans without fighting; the first significant contact took place with clashes at Virbalis. The first full-scale operation was invasion of East Prussia on 17 August 1914 and the Austro-Hungarian province of Galicia. The Russian offensive in the Battle of Stallupönen, which was the opening battle of the Eastern Front, quickly turned to a disastrous defeat following the Battle of Tannenberg in August 1914; even though the Russians were successfully defending at Gumbinnen a while before Tannenberg. After the Russian disaster, German troops under the command of Hindenburg inflicted another crushing defeat on the numerically superior Russian army in the First Battle of the Masurian Lakes. A second Russian incursion into Galicia was more successful, with the Russians controlling almost all of that region by the end of 1914, routing four Austrian armies in the process. Under the command of Nikolai Ivanov, Nikolai Ruzsky and Aleksei Brusilov, the Russians won the Battle of Galicia in September and began the Siege of Przemyśl, the next fortress on the road towards Kraków.

This early Russian success in 1914 on the Austro-Russian border was a reason for concern to the Central Powers and caused considerable German forces to be transferred to the East to take pressure off the Austrians, leading to the creation of the new German Ninth Army. The Austro-Hungarian government accepted the Polish proposal of establishing the Supreme National Committee as the Polish central authority within the Empire, responsible for the formation of the Polish Legions, an auxiliary military formation within the Austro-Hungarian army. At the end of 1914, the main focus of the fighting shifted to central part of Russian Poland, west of the river Vistula. The October Battle of the Vistula River, Augustow operation, and the November Battle of Łódź brought the Germans only huge losses, and the strengthening of the Russians in the region. The Germans' initial plans to destroy the Russians in Poland ended in desperate attempts to prevent their invasion of Silesia

At the same time, Austria-Hungary was trying to regain the territories lost in the summer. They attacked the Russians on the San River, and after a long period of fighting, they were forced to retreat. The Russians went on the offensive, came close to Krakow and occupied Chernivtsi, but a counterattack by the Central Powers saved the situation.

The Ottoman Empire joined the war after the Black Sea raid, the first battle was the Battle of Cape Sarych. The Russians declared war on the Ottoman Empire on 1 November 1914.

The year ended with a bloody battle on the rivers Bzura, Ravka, Nida and Pilica, where the Central Powers planned to take Warsaw, but could not and were forced to withdraw from the battle.

== 1915 ==
=== Central Powers victories, retreat of the Imperial Russian Army ===
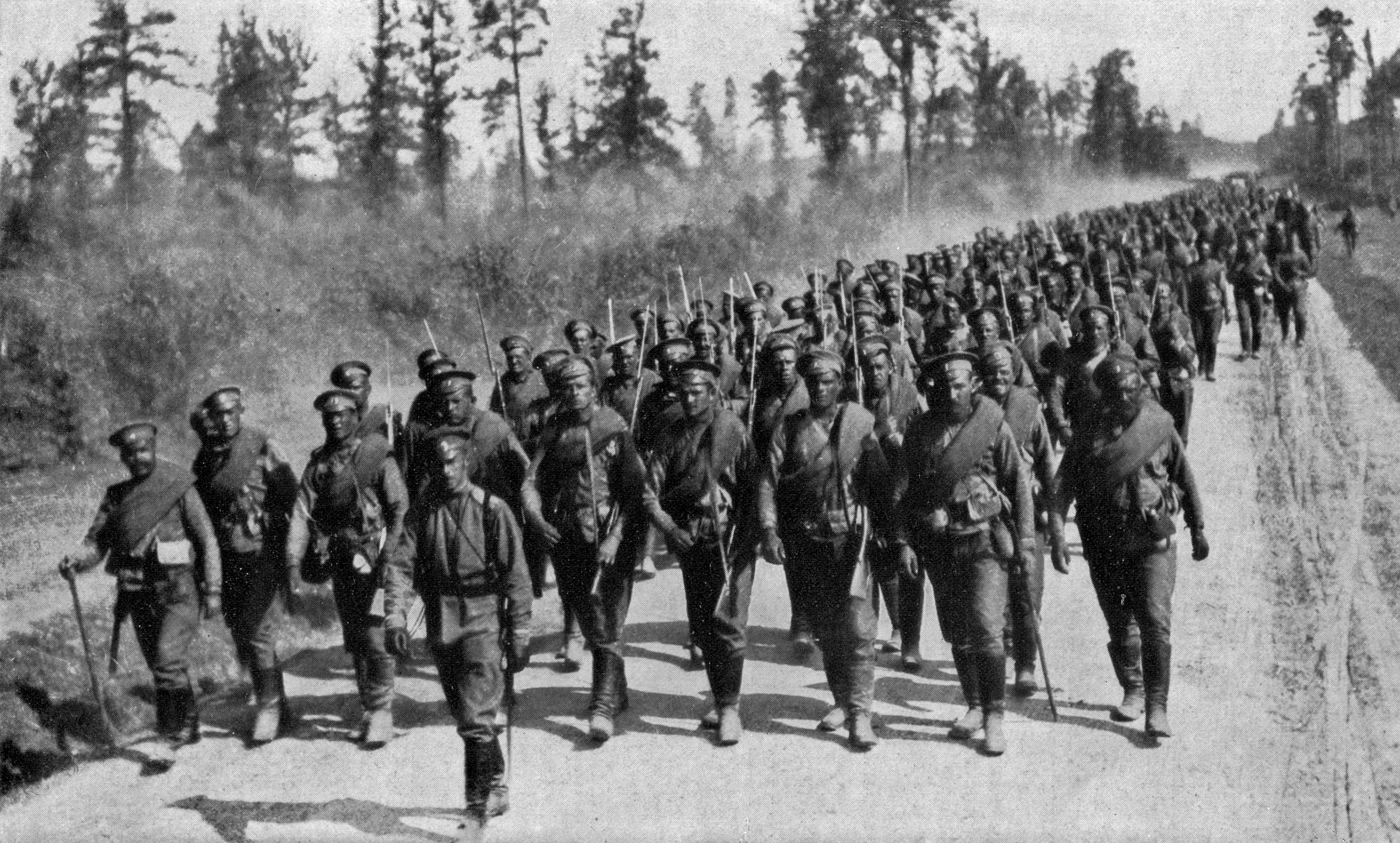
Russian troops going to the front: Support for the imperial guard being hurried into the fighting line.

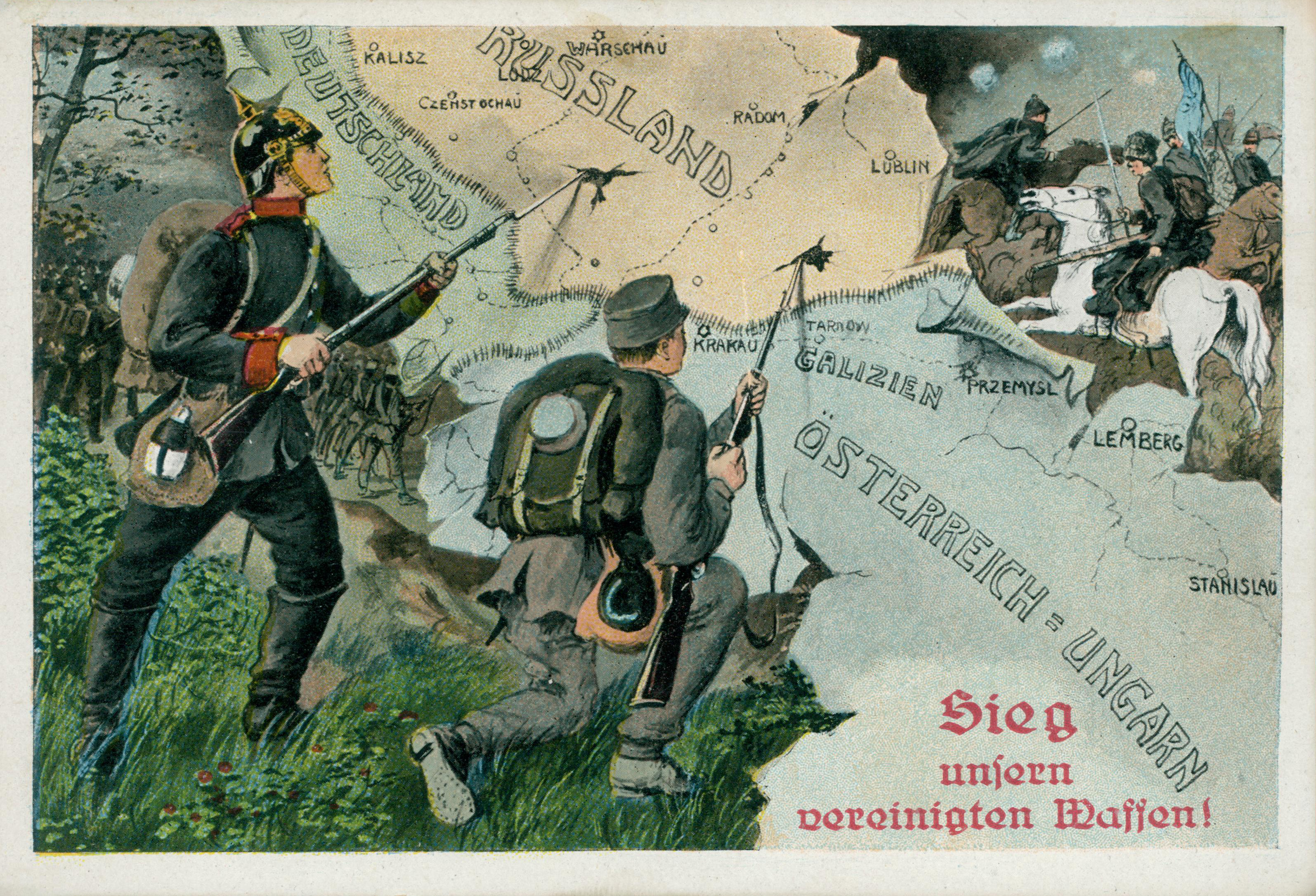
Postcard depicting a German and Austro-Hungarian soldier fighting together against Russia. Translated caption: "Victory with our united weapons!"

In 1915 the Chief of German Great General Staff, General of Infantry Erich von Falkenhayn decided to make its main effort on the Eastern Front, and accordingly transferred considerable forces there. The year began with a successful German offensive in the area of the Masurian lakes. At the same time, a large battle for the city of Przasnysz took place on the Polish front. The city changed hands several times but eventually remained in Russian hands. As a result of the battle, the Germans lost from 38,000 to 60,000 soldiers and Russian losses amounted to about 40,000 men. In March, the Germans tried to take Poland again, the third Battle of Warsaw began, and like the previous two, ended with the defeat of Germany. In May 1915, to eliminate the Russian threat the Central Powers began the successful Gorlice–Tarnów Offensive in Galicia.

After the Second Battle of the Masurian Lakes, the German and Austro-Hungarian troops on the Eastern Front functioned under a unified command. The offensive soon turned into a general advance and a corresponding strategic retreat by the Russian Army. The cause of the reverses suffered by the Russian Army, despite a significant numerical superiority over the German enemy, was not so much errors in the tactical sphere, as the deficiency in technical equipment, particularly in artillery and ammunition as well as the corruption and incompetence of the Russian officers. Only by 1916 did the buildup of Russian war industries increase the production of war material and improve the supply situation.

By mid-1915, the Russians had been expelled from Russian Poland, The whole campaign cost the Russians about 400,000 men, however, the Germans and Austrians suffered setbacks, their attempt to break through to Lublin was repulsed with losses of 37,500 men, and the Russians lost 9,524 men as well, and hence pushed hundreds of kilometers away from the borders of the Central Powers, removing the threat of Russian invasion of Germany, although there was still slight Russian penetration into Austria-Hungary. At the end of 1915 the German-Austrian advance was stopped on the line Riga–Jakobstadt–Dünaburg–Baranovichi–Pinsk–Dubno–Tarnopol. The general outline of this front line did not change until the Russian collapse in 1917.

During the campaign of 1915, the Russian Empire lost the entire line of western fortresses, and more than 4,000 guns. The causes of heavy defeats and losses of personnel, weapons, and as a result—vast territories (the entire Kingdom of Poland, part of the Baltic states, Grodno, partly Volhynia and Podolia provinces—up to 300,000 square kilometers) were to a large extent systemic shortcomings in the management of the armed forces and the defense industry. The multi-stage placement of military orders, their slow passage in the depths of the War Ministry, the disunity of the front and rear played a negative role. Thus, until the autumn of 1915, the Russian Supreme Commander-in-Chief only coordinated the actions of the commanders-in-chief of the armies of the fronts, distributed reinforcements, requesting them from the War Ministry. The Minister of War was responsible for organizing the production of weapons and ammunition, the implementation of the replenishment of troop personnel, military transportation outside the provinces declared a theater of military operations. The military districts in the theater of operations were subordinate to the commanders-in-chief of the armies of the fronts, but not to the Headquarters. Military production also lagged behind: until the end of autumn, the active army suffered from a shortage of rifles and ammunition, the consumption of which turned out to be incommensurable with the volume of production.

Contemporaries also noted the isolation of the Russian commanding staff from the soldiers, the lack of practical warfare skills among the top-level commanders. "We did have courage to send people to mass slaughter, hiding behind the difficulty of tactical responsibility, to slaughter often without purpose. We sent them, being ourselves far away, not seeing either our own or the enemy, and therefore not conforming to reality. Instead of punishment, we reward such leaders, because as far as the leaders were far away, the same, but still more, the higher leaders kept even more distant. People ceased to be people, but turned into pawns. We went to the fight in a state of some kind of oblivion and stunnedness", wrote the representative of the Supreme Commander-in-Chief, Infantry General Fyodor Palitzin, in his diary.

Failures in the Russian system of command and control of troops and the organization of hostilities occurred at other levels. Thus, serious shortcomings in reconnaissance led to the absence of any analysis of the enemy's plans and actions. With a general superiority in forces, almost every Central Powers's operation in 1915 was "unexpected" for the command from the front to the regimental level. Passion for undercover intelligence in the highest Russian headquarters did not justify itself, and tactical intelligence was still based on barely reliable testimony of prisoners, in the absence of which the command up to the army, inclusive, was simply "blind". The separation of artillery from infantry with subordination to the inspectors of the corps and ammunition supply units (park brigades and divisions) created difficulties in the operational replenishment of ammunition and shells in the combat units. At the same time, huge stockpiles of ammunition were created in the fortresses, which were then delivered to the enemy during the retreat or destroyed due to the impossibility of evacuation. Special units were not created for the construction of fortifications in the rear of the troops. Most often, such work was hastily carried out by militia squads and the mobilized local population, sometimes including women, and then brought to the necessary defensive state by the combat units retreating on them, already exhausted by battles and night marches.

Russian strategic expanses allowed the army to take a break from failures and start active resistance, the Germans could no longer use the lack of artillery supplies from the Russians and the first setbacks began, the breakthrough to Minsk and the offensive on Dvinsk completely failed with heavy losses for the Germans, the offensive in central Belarus also turned out to be unsuccessful, the Russians began to behave more actively on the southern front, where Austria-Hungary suffered a heavy defeat near Lutsk, the situation was saved by German reserves. The Russians also began to go on the offensive to ease the pressure on Serbia, although unsuccessfully, but there was a turning point in the war in favor of Russia, failing to finish the campaign in 1915, the Germans were deprived of the opportunity to win the war.

=== Russo-Turkish offensive, winter 1915–1916 ===
After the Battle of Sarikamish, the Russo-Turkish front quickly turned in favor of Russian forces. The Turks were concerned with reorganizing their army and also fighting the massive Allied armada that landed in Galipoli. Meanwhile, Russia was preoccupied with other armies on the Eastern Front. However, the appointment of Grand Duke Nicholas Nikolaevich as Viceroy and Commander in the Caucasus in September 1915 revived the situation of the Russo-Turkish front.

When the Allies withdrew from Gallipoli in December, the Caucasus Army's Chief of Staff General Nikolai Yudenich believed Turkish forces would take action against his army. This concern was legitimate: Bulgaria's entry into the war as Germany's ally in October caused serious alarm, as a land route from Germany to Turkey was now open and would allow for an unrestricted flow of German weapons to the Turks. A "window of opportunity" appeared that would allow the Russians to destroy the Turkish Third Army, as the British required assistance in Mesopotamia (now modern day Iraq). Britain's efforts to besiege Baghdad had been halted at Ctesiphon, and they were forced to retreat. This led to an increasing number of attacks by Turkish forces. The British requested the Russians to attack in an attempt to distract the Turks, and Yudenich agreed. The resulting offensive began on 10 January 1916.

This offensive was unanticipated by the Turks, as it was in the middle of winter. The Turkish situation was exacerbated by the absences of Third Army's commander Kamil Pasha and Chief of Staff Major Guse. Coupled with an imbalance of forces – the Russians had 325,000 troops while the Turks only 78,000 – the situation appeared grim for the Central Powers. After three months of fighting, the Russians captured the city of Trabzon on 18 April 1916.

In February 1916, Nikolai Yudenich had taken the cities of Erzurum and Trabzon. Trabzon had provided the Russians with a port to receive reinforcements in the Caucasus. Enver Pasha ordered the Third Army, now under Vehip Pasha, to retake Trabzon. Vehip's attack failed and General Yudenich counterattacked on July 2. The Russian attack hit the Turkish communications center of Erzincan forcing Vehip's troops to retreat as well as losing 34,000 men, half taken as POWs. As a result, the Third Army was rendered ineffective for the rest of the year and Erzincan was captured by the Russians. In the same year, the Russians attacked Muş and Bitlis and occupied both cities.

== 1916 ==
Allied operations in 1916 were dictated by an urgent need to force Germany to transfer forces from its Western to Eastern fronts, to relieve the pressure on the French at the Battle of Verdun. This was to be accomplished by a series of Russian offensives which would force the Germans to deploy additional forces to counter them. The first such operation was the Lake Naroch Offensive in March–April 1916, the Germans repulsed the attacks, but the offensive achieved its main goal—the Germans stopped the attack on Verdun, giving the French a break.

=== Brusilov offensive ===
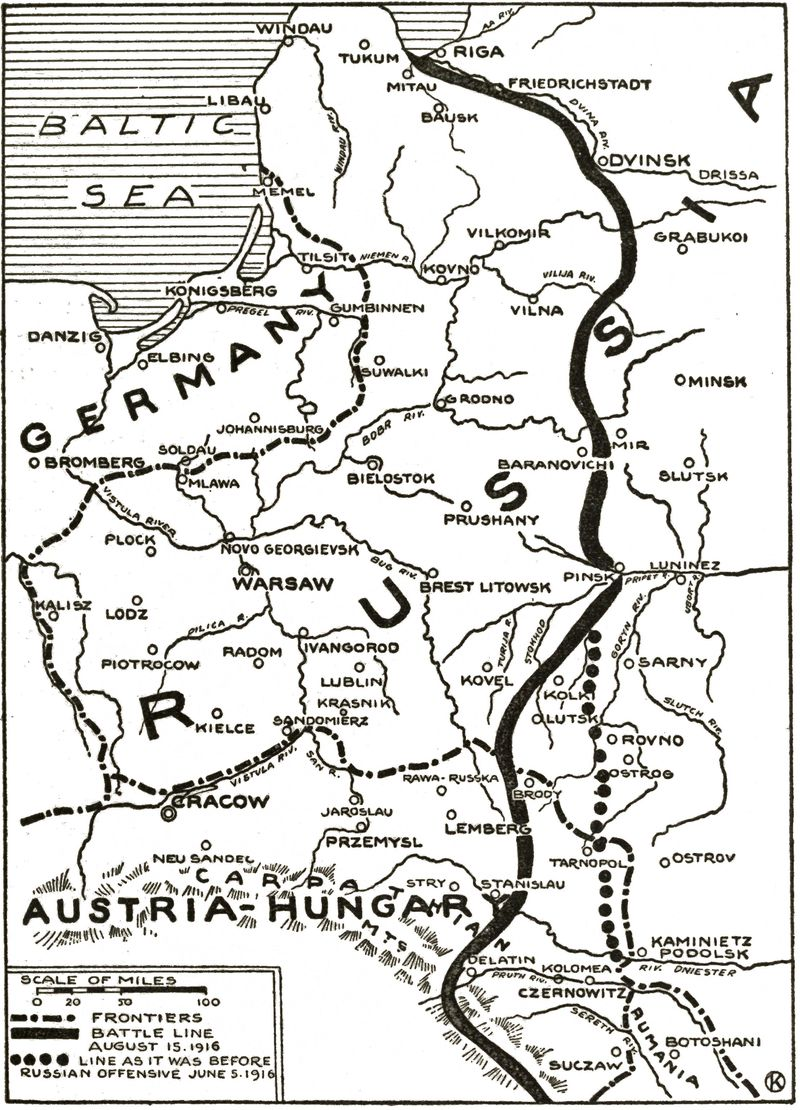
Brusilov offensive.

The Italian operations during 1916 had one extraordinary result: Austrian divisions were pulled away from the Russian southern front. This allowed the Russian forces to organize a counter-offensive. The Brusilov offensive was a large tactical assault carried out by Russian forces against Austro-Hungarian forces in Galicia. General Aleksei Brusilov believed victory against the Central Powers was possible if close attention was paid to preparation. Brusilov suggested that the Russians should attack on a wide front, and to position their trenches a mere 75 yards (70 m) away from Austrian trenches.

Brusilov's plan worked impeccably. The Russians outnumbered the Austrians 200,000 to 150,000, and held a considerable advantage in guns, with 904 large guns to 600. Most importantly innovative new tactics similar to those independently invented by Erwin Rommel were used to perform quick and effective close-range surprise attacks that allowed a steady advance. The Russian Eighth Army overwhelmed the Austrian Fourth and pushed on to Lutsk, advancing 40 miles (60 km) beyond the starting position. Over a million Austrians were lost, with over 500,000 men killed or taken prisoner by mid-June. German losses at between 184,000 and 500,000.

The Ottoman 15th Army Corps, which arrived at the front in the midst of the fighting, also suffered severe losses. During the fierce fighting of September 16-17, the corps lost 7,000 soldiers and 95 officers. Soon, during the repulse of another Russian offensive on September 30, the Turkish defensive lines were again hit hard, resulting in losses of another 5,000 men. Thus, in these two key battles of September alone, the total losses of the expeditionary force reached 12,000 soldiers.

Although the Brusilov offensive was initially successful, it slowed down considerably. An inadequate number of troops and poorly maintained supply lines hindered Brusilov's ability to follow up on the initial victories in June. The Brusilov offensive is considered to be the greatest Russian victory of the First World War. Although it cost the Russians half a million casualties during the first two months alone, the offensive successfully diverted substantial forces of the Central Powers from the Western front, and persuaded Romania to join the war, diverting even more Central Powers forces to the East.

=== Development of Russian industry ===
A series of failures in 1915 gave the Russians time to reconfigure industry for wartime, and they did it successfully, Russian industry began to overtake Austrian industry in terms of growth rates and eventually increased the productivity of ammunition several times. Here is what information was announced at the Duma meeting:

The production of rifles doubled, the production of machine guns increased 6 times, the production of light guns increased 9 times, the production of artillery shells increased 40 times, the production of heavy artillery increased 4 times, and finally, the production of aircraft increased 4 times.

=== Romania enters the war ===
It is no exaggeration to say that Roumania may be the turning-point of the campaign. If the Germans fail there it will be the greatest disaster inflicted upon them. Afterwards it will only be a question of time. But should Germany succeed I hesitate to think what the effect will be on the fortunes of the campaign. … and yet no one seems to have thought it his particular duty to prepare a plan...

— David Lloyd George, War Memoirs

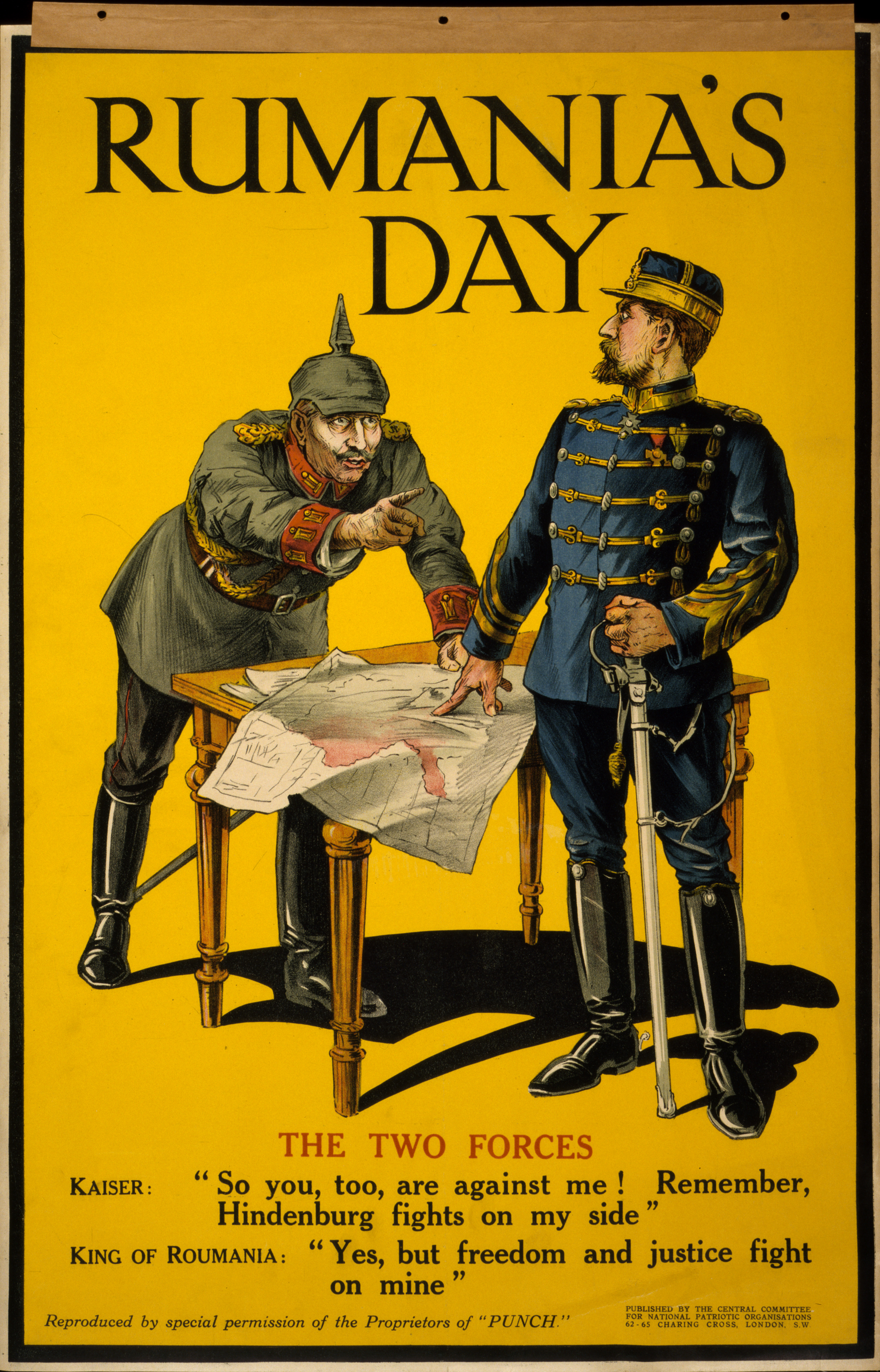
British poster, welcoming Romania's decision to join the Entente.

Up until 1916, the Romanians followed the course of the war with interest, while attempting to situate themselves in the most advantageous position. French and Russian diplomats had begun courting the Romanians early on, but their attempted persuasion gradually intensified. For King Ferdinand to commit his force of half a million men, he expected the Allies to offer a substantial incentive. Playing on Romanian anti-Hungarian sentiment the Allies promised the Austria-Hungarian territory of Ardeal (Transylvania) to Romania. Transylvanian demographics strongly favoured the Romanians. Romania succumbed to Allied enticement on 18 August 1916. Nine days later, on 27 August, Romanian troops marched into Transylvania.

Romania's entry into the war provoked major strategic challenges for the Germans. In September 1916, German troops were mobilized to the Eastern Front. Additionally, the German Chief of the General Staff, General Erich Von Falkenhayn was forced to resign from office though his successor appointed him to command the combined Central Powers forces against Romania, along with General August von Mackensen. Kaiser Wilhelm II immediately replaced Falkenhayn with Paul von Hindenburg. Von Hindenburg's deputy, the more adept Erich Ludendorff, was given effective control of the army and ordered to advance on Romania. On 3 September, the first troops of the Central Powers marched into Romanian territory. Simultaneously, the Bulgarian Air Force commenced an incessant bombing of Bucharest. In an attempt to relieve some pressure, French and British forces launched a new offensive known as the Battle of the Somme, while the Brusilov offensive continued in the East.

It is certain that so relatively small a state as Rumania had never before been given a role so important, and, indeed, so decisive for the history of the world at so favorable a moment. Never before had two Great Powers like Germany and Austria found themselves so much at the mercy of the military resources of a country which had scarcely one twentieth of the population of the two great states. Judging by the military situation, it was to be expected that Rumania had only to advance where she wished to decide the world war in favor of those Powers which had been hurling themselves at us in vain for years. Thus everything seemed to depend on whether Rumania was ready to make any sort of use of her momentary advantage.

— Paul von Hindenburg, Out of My Life

The entrance of Romania into the war was disconcerting for von Hindenburg. On 15 September, Paul von Hindenburg issued the following order, stating that: "The main task of the Armies is now to hold fast all positions on the Western, Eastern, Italian and Macedonian Fronts, and to employ all other available forces against Rumania." Fortunately for the Central Powers, the quantity and quality of the Romanian Army was overestimated. Although numbering half a million men, the Romanian Army suffered from poor training and a lack of appropriate equipment.

The initial success of the Romanian Army in Austro-Hungarian territory was quickly thrown into reverse by the Central Powers. German and Austro-Hungarian troops advanced from the north, while Bulgarian-Turkish-German forces marched into Romania from the south. Although thought to be a tactical blunder by contemporaries, the Romanians opted to mount operations in both directions instead of concentrating their forces. By the middle of November, German forces had passed through the Carpathians, suffering significant casualties facing stiff Romanian resistance. By 5 December, Bulgarian troops had crossed the Danube and were approaching the capital, Bucharest. At the same time as the Austro-Hungarian troops moved east, and as the Bulgarians marched north, the Turks had sent in two army divisions by sea to the Dobruja from the east. Romania now faced annihilation from three sides. The remaining Romanian forces were pushed back beyond the Siret in northern Moldavia. Romania received little direct help from the Allies despite previous assurances, with the French only dispatching a military mission of a thousand officers, health and support staff.

=== Proclamation to win over the Poles ===
The Act of 5 November 1916 was proclaimed then to the Poles jointly by the Emperors Wilhelm II of Germany and Franz Joseph of Austria-Hungary. This act promised the creation of the Kingdom of Poland out of territory of Congress Poland, envisioned by its authors as a puppet state controlled by the Central Powers. The origin of that document was the dire need to draft new recruits from German-occupied Poland for the war with Russia. Following the Armistice of 11 November 1918 ending the World War I, in spite of the previous initial total dependence of the kingdom on its sponsors, it ultimately served against their intentions as the cornerstone proto state of the nascent Second Polish Republic, the latter composed also of territories never intended by the Central Powers to be ceded to Poland.

=== Aftermath of 1916 ===
By January 1917, the ranks of the Romanian army had been significantly thinned. Roughly 150,000 Romanian soldiers had been taken prisoner, 200,000 men were dead or wounded, and lost two thirds of their country, including the capital. Importantly, the Ploiești oilfields, the only significant source of oil in Europe west of the Black Sea, had been destroyed before they were abandoned to the Central Powers.

== 1917 ==
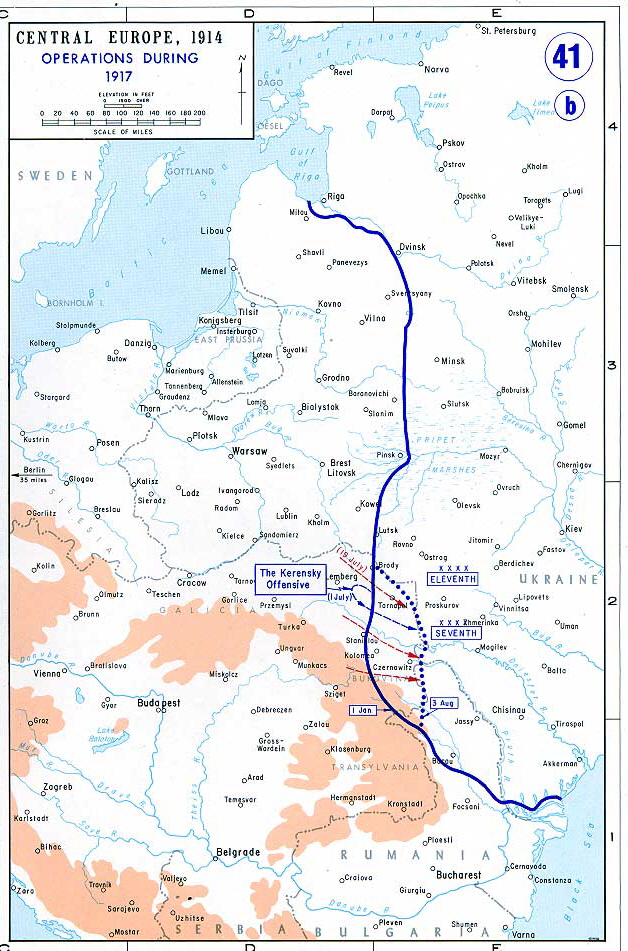
Eastern Front as of 1917.

=== The Russian Army in 1917 ===
Most modern observers believe that the Russian army was destined to lose the war after 1916. However, Russian General Aleksei Brusilov held a different opinion and wrote in his memoirs: "People mistakenly believe that after the retreat of 1915, the Russian army could not fight, by the end of 1916 it was well trained and accomplished an incredible feat... She defeated the superior forces of the enemy, and in such numbers that no other army in the world could have won." Russia's withdrawal from the war turned out to be a nightmare for the Western Allies. Even the entry of the United States into the war did not immediately help the Allies recover from the loss of strength and assistance that the Russian army had brought to the Allied war effort.

Winston Churchill also confirms the strength of the Russian army: "History was not so merciless to any country as to Russia. Her ship was pulled when the harbor was already visible, the ship was wrecked when the storm passed. All the victims had already been transferred, the work was already over. Despair and change overcame the authorities when the task was already completed.” These words are also supported by Russian monogrophist Sergei Oldenburg, who wrote one of the largest works about the time of Tsar Nicholas II. Oldenburg believes that the Russian troops were in excellent condition by the beginning of 1917, he claims the army was well supplied and well fed, and there were 50 percent more Russians than Austro-Germans in terms of the number of armed men at the front, and the Russians had 10 percent more artillery in terms of the number of guns. The supply of new guns was also significant, allegedly almost as much as the total of Britain and France combined. In the army of the Central Powers, due to the war, there were declines in industrial opportunities, except for Austria, but the growth rate of Russian industry was still higher.

Even the armies of the Central Powers assessed the condition of the Russians and their combat strength, more than 72 percent of all infantry divisions were characterized by the information committee of the Austrian General Staff as: "outstanding units" and "first-class troops". However, all these material successes came to naught after the February Revolution, which killed the moral composition of the army, causing an incredible wave of deserters. Also worth noting is the Russian Expeditionary Force, which continued to maintain a presence on both the Western Front and the Macedonian front, even after the October Revolution, remaining on those fronts until the Armistice on 11 November 1918. Even after the February Revolution, most of the Russian Army remained intact and at the front, willing to fight defensively but ineffective on the offensive. The demands of the soldiers after the revolution were mainly about reducing certain powers that officers had, and many still supported fighting a defensive war. Units in the rear were more likely to demand immediate peace than front line units. Desertions on a significant scale only began after the October Revolution, and accelerated in February 1918 when peace negotiations between the Bolsheviks and Germans broke down.

=== Russia – the February Revolution ===
The Russian February Revolution aimed to topple the Russian monarchy and resulted in the creation of the Provisional Government. The revolution was a turning point in Russian history, and its significance and influence can still be felt in many countries today. Although many Russians wanted a revolution, no one had expected it to happen when it did – let alone how it did.

On International Women's Day, 23 February [O.S. 10 February] 1917, as many as 90,000 female workers in the city of Petrograd left their factory jobs and marched through the streets, shouting "Bread", "Down with the autocracy!" and "Stop the War!" These women were tired, hungry, and angry, after working long hours in miserable conditions to feed their families because their menfolk were fighting at the front. They were not alone in demanding change; more than 150,000 men and women took to the streets to protest the next day.

By Saturday, 25 February, the city of Petrograd was essentially shut down. No one was allowed to work or wanted to work. Even though there were a few incidents of police and soldiers firing into the crowds, those groups soon mutinied and joined the protesters. Tsar Nicholas II, who was not in Petrograd during the revolution, heard reports of the protests but chose not to take them seriously. By 1 March, it was obvious to everyone except the Tsar himself, that his rule was over. On 2 March it was made official. From this point onwards Russia was administered by the Russian Provisional Government until the October Revolution.

=== Romania – the Summer Campaign ===
In early July 1917, on a relatively small area of the Romanian front, there began one of the largest concentrations of combat forces and means known during the conflagration: nine armies, 80 infantry divisions with 974 battalions, 19 cavalry divisions with 550 squadrons and 923 artillery batteries; in total they numbered some 800,000 men, with about one million in their immediate reserve. Between late July and early September, the Romanian Army fought the battles of Mărăști, Mărășești and Oituz, managing to stop the German-Austro-Hungarian advance, inflicting heavy losses in the process and winning the most important Allied victories on the Eastern Front in 1917. As a result of these operations, the remaining Romanian territories remained unoccupied, tying down nearly 1,000,000 Central Powers troops and prompting The Times to describe the Romanian front as "The only point of light in the East".

=== Kerensky offensive ===
On 29 June 1917, Alexander Kerensky, the Minister of War in the Russian Provisional Government, launched the Kerensky offensive to end Austria-Hungary once and for all. The Russians made only 6 miles (9.7 km) of progress but the Austrians counterattacked and drove them almost entirely out of Austria-Hungary, and they retreated 150 miles (240 km), losing Tarnopol, Stanislau and Czernowitz. This defeat was accompanied by 60,000 casualties and contributed greatly to the October Revolution.

=== Russia – the October Revolution ===
Although the February Revolution had overthrown the Tsar, the Bolsheviks still were not satisfied. In their view, the new Provisional Government was merely a more deceptive continuation of the previous government; they still refused to withdraw from the war despite how badly it was going. The upper class still wielded considerable influence in Russian economics and politics, so by September 1917, Lenin began advocating for a second revolution—one that would allow the workers and peasants to gain total control over the country. The Central Committee of the Bolshevik Party convened on 10 October, and after much heated debate, agreed that it was time to begin planning for an armed insurrection. Troops who were loyal to the Bolsheviks took control of the telegraph stations, power stations, strategic bridges, post offices, train stations, and state banks.

Petrograd was officially in the hands of the Bolsheviks, who greatly increased their organization in factory groups and in many barracks throughout Petrograd. They concentrated on devising a plan for overturning the Provisional Government, with a coup d'état. On 24 October, Lenin emerged from hiding in a suburb, entered the city, set up his headquarters at the Smolny Institute and worked to complete his three-phase plan. With the main bridges and the main railways secured, only the Winter Palace, and with it the Provisional Government, remained to be taken. On the evening of 7 November, the troops that were loyal to the Bolsheviks infiltrated the Winter Palace. After an almost bloodless coup, the Bolsheviks were the new leaders of Russia. Lenin announced that the new Bolshevik government would immediately be seeking an end to the war, implementing a system of worker's democracy, and establishing collective ownership of all farms and factories.

== 1918 ==
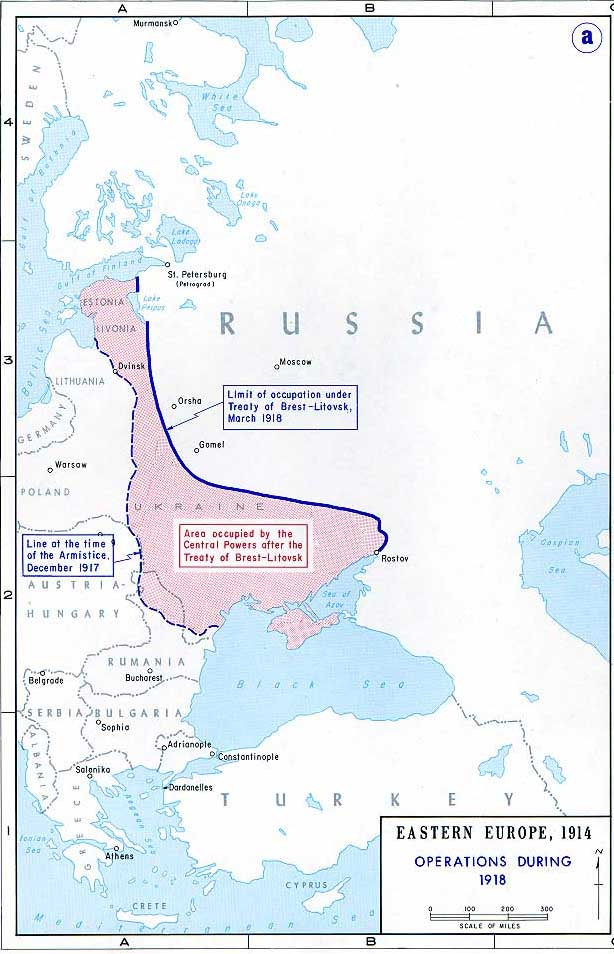
Territory lost by Russia under the 1918 Treaty of Brest-Litovsk.

Lenin's new Bolshevik government tried to end the war, with a ceasefire being declared on 15 December 1917 along lines agreed in November. At the same time, the Bolsheviks launched a full-scale military offensive against its opponents: Ukraine and separatist governments in the Don region. During the peace negotiations between the Soviets and the Central Powers, the Germans demanded enormous concessions, eventually resulting in the failure of the long-drawn-out peace negotiations on 17 February 1918. At the same time, the Central Powers concluded a military treaty with Ukraine which was losing ground in the fight with invading Bolshevik forces.

The Russian Civil War, which started just after November 1917, would tear apart Russia for three years. As a result of the events in 1917, many groups opposed to Lenin's Bolsheviks had formed. With the fall of Nicholas II, many parts of the Russian Empire took the opportunity to declare their independence, one of which was Finland, which did so in December 1917; however, Finland too collapsed into a civil war. Finland declared itself independent on 6 December 1917, and this was accepted by Lenin a month later. However, the Socialists (The Reds) and the Whites in Finland fell into war with each other in January 1918. The Reds wanted Finland to be a Soviet republic and were aided by Russian forces still in Finland.

The Whites of Finland were led by General C.G.E.Mannerheim, a Finnish baron who had been in the Tsar's service since he was 15 years old. The Whites were also offered help by a German Expeditionary Corps led by German General Goltz. Though Mannerheim never accepted the offer, the German corps landed in Finland in April 1918.

=== Formation of the Red Army ===
Although the majority of the Russian army was still at the front lines in late 1917, the Council of People's Commissars headed by Leon Trotsky set about creating a new army controlled by the Bolsheviks. By a decree on 28 January 1918, the council created the Workers' and Peasants' Red Army; it began recruitment on a voluntary basis, but on 22 April, the Soviet government made serving in the army compulsory for anyone who did not employ hired labor. Several officers who had served in the Russian Imperial Army defected to the Red Army in support of the Bolshevik cause. Many of them were of an aristocratic background but became disillusioned with imperialism and monarchism, although the Red Army still mostly consisted of ordinary workers and peasants.

== Aftermath ==
In historiography, the front is usually described as a Central Powers victory and a Russian defeat. Despite the Russian defeat of the Eastern Front, the failure of the German spring offensive is directly related to the fact that the Germans kept all their cavalry in the east.

=== Treaty of Brest-Litovsk (March 1918) ===
With the German Army just 85 miles (137 km) from the Russian capital Petrograd (St. Petersburg) on 3 March 1918, the Treaty of Brest-Litovsk was signed and the Eastern Front ceased to be a war zone. In the treaty, Soviet Russia ceded 34% of the former empire's population, 54% of its industrial land, 89% of its coalfields, and 26% of its railroads. The total losses in land amounted to 1 million square kilometers. Lenin bitterly called the settlement "that abyss of defeat, dismemberment, enslavement and humiliation." While the treaty was practically obsolete before the end of the year, it did provide some relief to the Bolsheviks, who were embroiled in a civil war, and affirmed the independence of Ukraine. However, Estonia and Latvia were intended to become a United Baltic Duchy to be ruled by German princes and German nobility as fiefdoms under the German Kaiser. A rump Polish state was also foreseen on the formerly Russian territories. Finland's sovereignty had already been declared in December 1917, and accepted by most nations, including France and Russia, but not by the United Kingdom and the United States.

=== Treaty of Bucharest (May 1918) ===
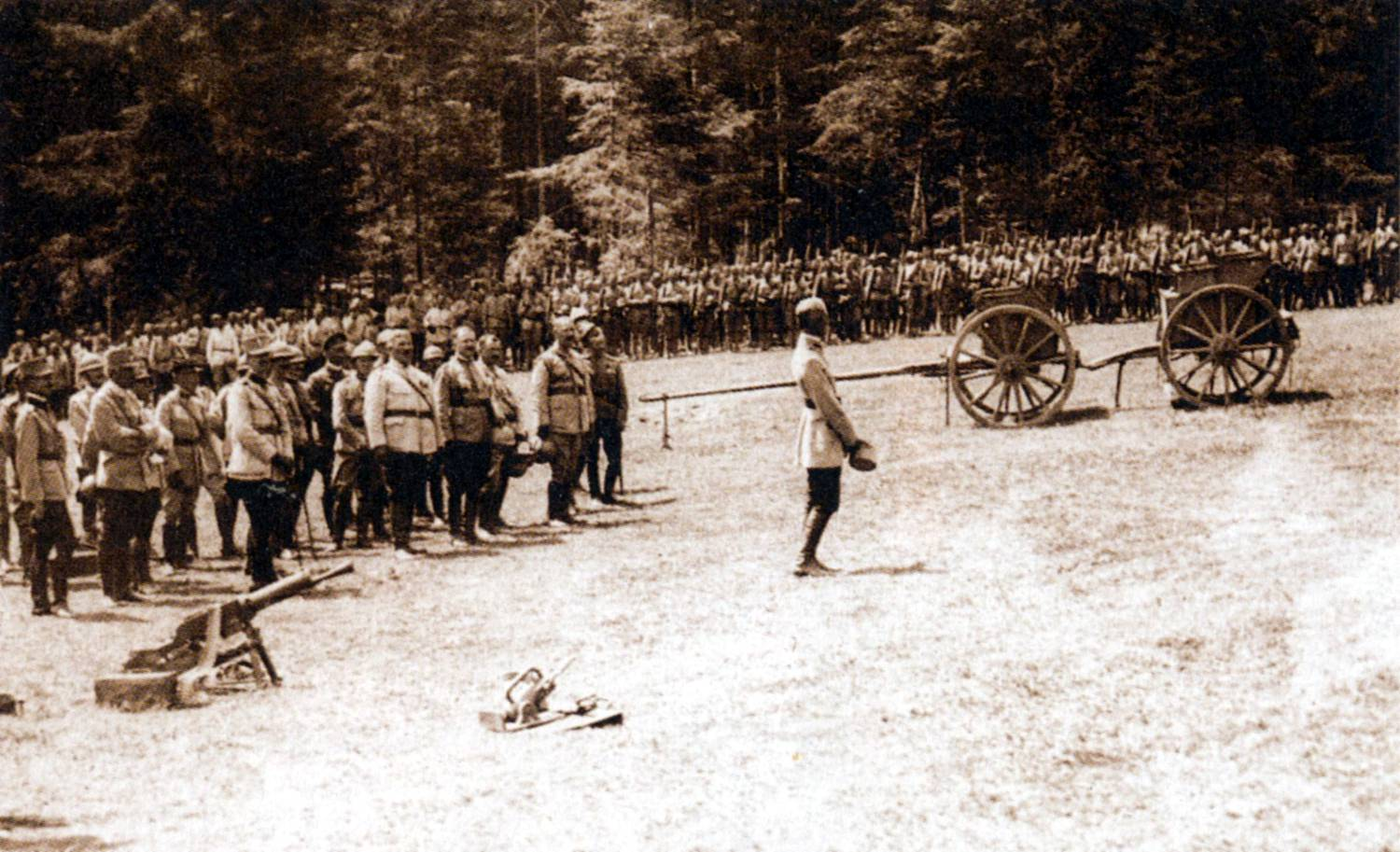
Romanian troops during the Battle of Mărășești, 1917.

On 7 May 1918 Romania signed the Treaty of Bucharest with the Central Powers, which recognised Romanian sovereignty over Bessarabia in return for ceding control of passes in the Carpathian Mountains to Austria-Hungary and granting oil concessions to Germany. Although approved by Parliament, Ferdinand I refused to sign the treaty, hoping for an Allied victory; Romania re-entered the war on 10 November 1918 on the side of the Allies and the Treaty of Bucharest was formally annulled by the Armistice of 11 November 1918. (Note: Bessarabia remained part of Romania until 1940, when it was annexed by Joseph Stalin as the Moldavian Soviet Socialist Republic; following the dissolution of the USSR in 1991, it became the independent Republic of Moldova) Between 1914 and 1918, an estimated 400,000 to 600,000 ethnic Romanians served with the Austro-Hungarian army, of whom up to 150,000 were killed in action; total military and civilian deaths within contemporary Romanian borders are estimated at 748,000.

The Germans were able to repair the oil fields around Ploiești and by the end of the war had pumped a million tons of oil. They also requisitioned two million tons of grain from Romanian farmers. These materials were vital in keeping Germany in the war to the end of 1918.

=== End of war ===
With the Treaty of Brest-Litovsk on 3 March 1918, Soviet Russia formally exited the war, conceding vast territories to the Central Powers; including Ukraine, Poland, the Baltic states, and parts of Belarus. This treaty removed the Eastern Front as an active war zone, freeing up German and Austro-Hungarian forces. The Germans were then able to transfer substantial forces to the west in order to mount an offensive in France in the spring of 1918.

This offensive on the Western Front failed to achieve a decisive breakthrough, and the arrival of more and more American units in Europe was sufficient to offset the German advantage. Even after the Russian collapse, about a million German soldiers remained tied up in the east until the end of the war, attempting to run a short-lived addition to the German Empire in Europe.

In the end, the Central Powers had to relinquish all of their captured lands on the eastern front, with Germany even being forced to cede territory they held before the war, under various treaties (such as the Treaty of Versailles) signed after the Armistice of 11 November 1918. Although the western Allied Powers victory led to the Central Powers being forced to cancel the treaty signed with Russia, the victors were at the time intervening in the Russian Civil War, causing bad relations between Russia and the Allied Powers.

=== New conflicts ===
After the central powers capitulated to the western Allied Powers, the countries in the east took advantage of the situation. Soviet Russia immediately cancelled the peace treaty and launched an offensive against the Baltic States, triggering the Baltic War of Liberation: Estonia, Latvia, and Lithuania resisted Bolshevik forces, eventually securing their independence. In Estonia, this struggle turned into the Estonian War of Independence, lasting until 1920 and culminating in the 1920 Treaty of Tartu, in which Soviet Russia recognized Estonia’s sovereignty.

The Polish-Soviet War was fought over contested borderlands in Ukraine and Belarus. The war ended with the Treaty of Riga in March 1921, which established a border in favor of Poland, incorporating large areas with Ukrainian and Belarusian populations into the Polish state.

Shortly before the Polish-Soviet War was that of the Polish–Czechoslovak War, also known as the Seven-Day War for its short duration. It was fought over the region of Cieszyn Silesia, and ended with a Czechoslovak favored ceasefire, with the extension of their land to Teschen Silesia.

The Hungarian-Romanian War was fought between Hungary and Romania from 13 November 1918 to 3 August 1919 which was won by Romania. Romania gained significant territory and its territory increased from about 150,000 square kilometres to almost 300,000 square kilometres after gaining Transylvania, parts of Banat, Bukovina and Bessarabia which were achieved by the Treaty of Trianon in June 1920.

== Role of women ==
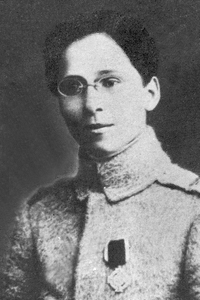
2nd Lt. Ecaterina Teodoroiu, killed in action at Mărășești in 1917, regarded as a national heroine in Romania.

In comparison to the attention directed to the role played by women on the Western Front during the First World War, the role of women in the east has garnered limited scholarly focus. It is estimated that 20 percent of the Russian industrial working class was conscripted into the army; therefore, women's share of industrial jobs increased dramatically. There were percentage increases in every industry, but the most noticeable increase happened in industrial labour, which increased from 31.4 percent in 1913 to 45 percent in 1918.

Women also fought on the Eastern Front. In the later stages of Russia's participation in the war, Russia began forming all-woman combat units, the Women's Battalions, in part to fight plummeting morale among male soldiers by demonstrating Russian women's willingness to fight. In Romania, Ecaterina Teodoroiu actively fought in the Romanian Army and is remembered today as a national hero.

British nursing efforts were not limited to the Western Front. Nicknamed the "Gray partridges" in reference to their dark gray overcoats, Scottish volunteer nurses arrived in Romania in 1916 under the leadership of Elsie Inglis. In addition to nursing injured personnel, Scottish nurses manned transport vehicles and acted as regimental cooks. The "Gray Partridges" were well respected by Romanian, Serbian and Russian troops and as a result, the Romanian press went as far as to characterize them as "healthy, masculine, and tanned women." As a testament to her abilities, Elsie Inglis and her volunteers were entrusted to turn an abandoned building in the city of Galați into an operational hospital, which they did in a little more than a day. Yvonne Fitzroy's published journal, "With the Scottish Nurses in Roumania," provides an excellent first hand account of Scottish nursing activities in the Eastern Front.

== Propaganda ==
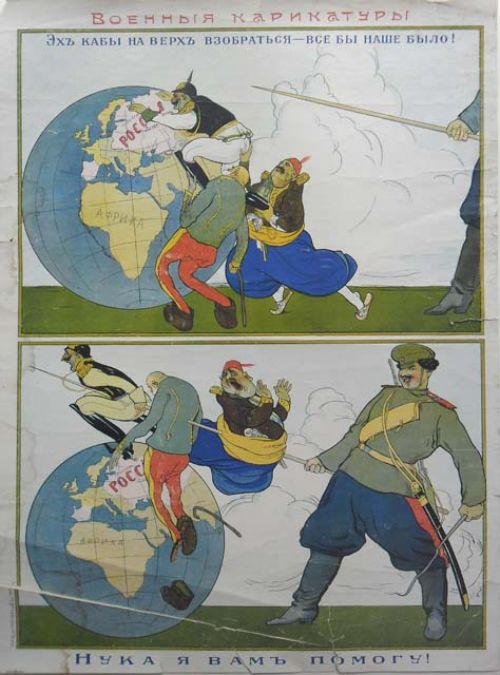
World War I caricature from Russia depicting Wilhelm II, Franz Joseph I and Mehmed V. Top: "If only we could get to the top – it would be ours!" Bottom: "Let me help you with that!"

Propaganda was a key component of the culture of World War I. It was often shown through state-controlled media, and helped to bolster nationalism and patriotism within countries. On the Eastern Front, propaganda took many forms such as opera, film, spy fiction, theater, spectacle, war novels and graphic art. Across the Eastern Front the amount of propaganda used in each country varied from state to state. Propaganda took many forms within each country and was distributed by many different groups. Most commonly the state produced propaganda, but other groups, such as anti-war organizations, also generated propaganda.

In order for the Russians to legitimize their war efforts, the government constructed an image of the enemy through state-instituted propaganda. Their main aim was to help overcome the legend of the "invincible" German war machine, in order to boost the morale of civilians and soldiers. Russian propaganda often took the form of showing the Germans as a civilized nation, with barbaric "inhuman" traits. Russian propaganda also exploited the image of the Russian POWs who were in the German camps, again in order to boost the morale of their troops, serving as encouragement to defeat the enemy and to get their fellow soldiers out of German POW camps that were perceived as inhumane.

An element of the Russian propaganda was the Investigate Commission formed in April 1915. It was led by Aleksei Krivtsov, and the study was tasked with the job of studying the legal violations committed by of the Central Powers and then getting this information to the Russian public. This commission published photographs of letters that were allegedly found on fallen German soldiers. These letters document the German correspondents saying to "take no prisoners." A museum was also set up in Petrograd, which displayed pictures that showed how "inhumanly" the Germans were treating prisoners of war.

Also, the Russians chose to discard the name Saint Petersburg to remove the German-sounding "Saint" and "-burg", favouring the more Russian-sounding Petrograd.

== Prisoners of war in Russia ==
During World War I, approximately 200,000 German soldiers and 2.5 million soldiers from the Austro-Hungarian army entered Russian captivity. During the 1914 Russian campaign the Russians began taking thousands of Austrian prisoners. As a result, the Russian authorities made emergency facilities in Kiev, Penza, Kazan, and later Turkestan to hold the Austrian prisoners of war. As the war continued Russia began to detain soldiers from Germany as well as a growing number from the Austro-Hungarian army. The Tsarist state saw the large population of POWs as a workforce that could benefit the war economy in Russia.

Many POWs were employed as farm laborers and miners in Donbas and Krivoi Rog. However, the majority of POWs were employed as laborers constructing canals and building railroads. The living and working environments for these POWs was bleak. There was a shortage of food, clean drinking water and proper medical care. During the summer months malaria was a major problem, and the malnutrition among the POWs led to many cases of scurvy. While working on the Murmansk rail building project over 25,000 POWs died. Information about the bleak conditions of the labor camps reached the German and Austro-Hungarian governments. They began to complain about the treatment of POWs. The Tsarist authorities initially refused to acknowledge the German and Habsburg governments. They rejected their claims because Russian POWs were working on railway construction in Serbia. However, they slowly agreed to stop using prison labor.

Life in the camps was extremely rough for the men who resided in them. The Tsarist government could not provide adequate supplies for the men living in their POW camps. The Russian government's inability to supply the POWs in their camps with supplies was due to inadequate resources and bureaucratic rivalries. However, the conditions in the POW camps varied; some were more bearable than others. The attitude towards Russian prisoners from the Central Powers was even worse, in some camps the mattress was for 4 people, and in others people were starved on purpose. At the beginning of 1915, a case was recorded of three prisoners being forced to run around the camp without stopping, in parallel they were stabbed with bayonets and beaten.

== Disease ==
Disease played a critical role in the loss of life on the Eastern Front. In the East, disease accounted for approximately four times the number of deaths caused by direct combat, in contrast to the three to one ratio in the West. Malaria, cholera, and dysentery contributed to the epidemiological crisis on the Eastern Front; however, typhus fever, transmitted by pathogenic lice and previously unknown to German medical officers before the outbreak of the war, was the most deadly. There was a direct correlation between the environmental conditions of the East and the prevalence of disease. With cities excessively crowded by refugees fleeing their native countries, unsanitary medical conditions created a suitable environment for diseases to spread. Primitive hygienic conditions, along with general lack of knowledge about proper medical care was evident in the German-occupied Ober Ost.

Ultimately, a large scale sanitation program was put into effect. This program, named Sanititätswesen (Medical Affairs), was responsible for ensuring proper hygienic procedures were being carried out in Latvia, Lithuania, and Poland. Quarantine centers were built, and diseased neighbourhoods were isolated from the rest of the population. Delousing stations were prevalent in the countryside and in cities to prevent the spread of typhus fever, with mass numbers of natives being forced to take part in this process at military bathhouses. A "sanitary police" was also introduced to confirm the cleanliness of homes, and any home deemed unfit would be boarded up with a warning sign. Dogs and cats were also killed for fear of possible infection.

To avoid the spread of disease, prostitution became regulated. Prostitutes were required to register for a permit, and authorities demanded mandatory medical examinations for all prostitutes, estimating that seventy percent of prostitutes carried a venereal disease. Military brothels were introduced to combat disease; the city of Kowno emphasized proper educational use of contraceptives such as condoms, encouraged proper cleansing of the genital area after intercourse, and gave instructions on treatment in the case of infection.

== Casualties ==
=== Russian casualties ===
The Russian casualties in the First World War are difficult to estimate, due to the poor quality of available statistics.

Cornish gives a total of 2,006,000 military dead (700,000 killed in action, 970,000 died of wounds, 155,000 died of disease and 181,000 died while POWs). This measure of Russian losses is similar to that of the British Empire, 5% of the male population in the 15 to 49 age group. He says civilian casualties were five to six hundred thousand in the first two years, and were then not kept, so a total of over 1,500,000 is not unlikely. He has over five million men passing into captivity, the majority during 1915. The report on prisoners issued by the official commission of the USSR put the figure at 3.3 million. Golovin, who conducted a study together with German veterans in the archives of the Central Powers, calculated the figure of 2,410,000 prisoners.

When Russia withdrew from the war, ~2,500,000 Russian POWs were in German and Austrian hands. This by far exceeded the total number of prisoners of war (1,880,000) lost by the armies of Britain, France and Germany combined. Only the Austro-Hungarian Army, with 2,200,000 POWs, came even close.

According to other data, the number of irretrievable losses in Russia ranges from 700,000 to 1,061,000. Golovin wrote a huge work dedicated to the losses of Russians in World War I, based on the documents of the headquarters and the documents of the German archive. Working together with German veterans, they came to the conclusion that total Russian losses were 7,917,000, including 1,300,000 dead, 4,200,000 wounded and 2,410,000 prisoners. Later estimates have adjusted this number to 2,420,000. Per Alexei Oleynikov total losses for the 1914–1917 campaigns look like this:

- 1914: 1,000,000+
- 1915: 3,000,000
- 1916: 2,000,000
- 1917: 400,000

According to the Russian historian Kersnovsky, Russia's losses amounted to 9,000,000. The death toll of a maximum of ~1,000,000+ people is also shared by other authors. (Note: 1,700,000) Per Grigori Krivosheev's seminal study, the Russians lost 2,254,000 dead, 2,844,500 wounded, and 3,343,900 captured, a total of 8,442,000 losses. The official website of the Russian archive published information that more than 622,000 people were killed, 3,750,000 were injured, and 2,410,000 were captured. (Note: Documents related to the war are kept in the Russian State Military Historical Archive)

=== Central Powers casualties ===
At that time, the losses of the Austro-German troops were as great. As General Günther Blumentritt wrote in his memoirs: «I will cite a little-known but significant fact, our losses on the Eastern Front were much higher than on the western.» Historian Oleynikov estimated the total losses at 5,100,000 people, The maximum estimate was up to 6,000,000 casualties, this ratio is much better than on the western front.

Similarly, the losses of the Central Powers in the East in the period from 1914 to 1916 were greater than similar losses on all other fronts, the Russian army was able to inflict damage to the enemy, estimates range from 4,600,000 to 5,400,000 people from a total loss of 8,090,000. The Russians also took the most prisoners, as many as 2,130,000, and according to other data 1,961,000. There is also an estimate of 2,200,000 prisoners, but the general trend remains to estimate about 2,000,000 people, which is six times more than all those prisoners who were captured by all the Entente countries combined.

Around 2.1 million soldiers of the Central Powers were prisoners of war in Russia. The majority of these were soldiers of Austria-Hungary. Approximately 140,000 Germans and around 80,000 Turks and Bulgarians were held in Russian captivity. Due to disease and inadequate supplies, the death rate among prisoners in Russia was the highest of all belligerent powers, at 20%. The overall death rate among prisoners of war held by the Central Powers was around 5-8%. In the prisoner-of-war camps, the Russians, for political reasons, favored Slavic prisoners over non-Slavic prisoners, while prisoners of war from the Western powers were given preferential treatment in Germany.

== Territorial changes ==
=== Austria ===
The Austrian Empire lost approximately 60% of its territory as a result of the war, and evolved into a smaller state with a small homogeneous population of 6.5 million people. During the disintegration of Austria-Hungary, the Republic of German Austria was established. This state presided over much of Cisleithania, including modern-day Austria as well as sections of Slovenia, Czechia, Poland, Italy and Hungary. The state officially claimed all territories of former Austria-Hungary that had majority-German populations, however this led to conflict with the Kingdom of Serbs, Croats, and Slovenes over Carinthia and Styria and dispute with Czechoslovakia over German Bohemia and the Sudetenland. The Republic of German Austria was dissolved and lost much of its claimed territory in the Treaty of Saint-Germain-en-Laye, being reduced to the modern borders of the country. The states that were formed around Austria feared the return of the Austro-Hungarian Empire and put measures into place to prevent it from re-forming.

=== Czechoslovakia ===
Czechoslovakia was created through the merging of the Czech provinces of Bohemia and Moravia, previously under Austrian rule, united with Slovakia and Ruthenia, which were part of Hungary. Although these groups had many differences between them, they believed that together they would create a stronger state. The new country was a multi-ethnic state. The population consisted of Czechs (51%), Slovaks (16%), Germans (22%), Hungarians (5%) and Rusyns (4%), with other ethnic groups making up 2%. Many of the Germans, Hungarians, Ruthenians and Poles and some Slovaks, felt oppressed because the political elite did not generally allow political autonomy for minority ethnic groups. The state proclaimed the official ideology that there are no Czechs and Slovaks, but only one nation of Czechoslovaks (see Czechoslovakism), to the disagreement of Slovaks and other ethnic groups. Once a unified Czechoslovakia was restored after World War II the conflict between the Czechs and the Slovaks surfaced again.

=== Hungary ===
After the war Hungary was severely disrupted by the loss of 72% of its territory, 64% of its population and most of its natural resources. The loss of territory was similar to that of Austria after the breaking up the Austria-Hungary territory. They lost the territories of Transylvania, Slovakia, Croatia, Slavonia, Syrmia, and Banat.

=== Italy ===
Italy incorporated the regions of Trieste and South Tyrol from Austria.

=== Poland ===
The creation of a free and Independent Poland was one of Wilson's fourteen points. At the end of the 18th century, the state of Poland was broken apart by Prussia, Russia, and Austria. During the Paris Peace Conference, 1919, the Commission on Polish Affairs was created which recommended there be a passageway across West Prussia and Posen, in order to give Poland access to the Baltic through the port of Danzig at the mouth of the Vistula River. The creation of the state of Poland would separate East Prussia from the rest of Germany, as it was before the Partitions of Poland. Poland also received Upper Silesia. British Foreign Secretary Lord Curzon proposed Poland's eastern border with Russia. Neither the Soviet Russians nor the Polish were happy with the demarcation of the border.

=== Romania ===
The state of Romania was enlarged greatly after the war. As a result of the Paris peace conference Romania kept the Dobrudja and Transylvania. Between the states of Yugoslavia, Czechoslovakia, and Romania an alliance named the Little Entente was formed. They worked together on matters of foreign policy in order to prevent a Habsburg restoration.

=== Yugoslavia ===
Initially Yugoslavia began as the Kingdom of Serbs, Croats and Slovenes. The name was changed to Yugoslavia in 1929. The State secured its territory at the Paris peace conference after the end of the war. The state suffered from many internal problems because of the many diverse cultures and languages within the state. Yugoslavia was divided on national, linguistic, economic, and religious lines.

== See also ==
- Middle Eastern theatre of World War I
- Belgian Expeditionary Corps in Russia, a Belgian armoured car unit that fought within the Russian military.
- Diplomatic history of World War I
- Bibliography of World War I
- Bibliography of the Russian Revolution and Civil War
- Outline of the Russian Revolution and Civil War

== Bibliography ==
- Beevor, Antony (2022). Russia: Revolution and Civil War, 1917–1921. Penguin. p. 46. ISBN 978-0-593-49388-5.
- Miltatuli, Pyotr (2017). Россия в эпоху царствование Николая 2 [Russia in the reign of Nicholas 2] (in Russian). Volume 2. Moscow: Русский издательский центр имени святого Василия Великого.
- Borisyuk, Andrey (2024). Забытая война. Россия в 1914-1918 [The forgotten war. Russia in 1914-1918] (in Russian). Moscow: Вече. ISBN 978-5-4484-5078-5.
- Kernosovsky, Anton (1938). История русской армии [History of the Russian army] (PDF).
- Gilbert, Martin (2023). The First World War: A complete History. Moscow: Квадрига. ISBN 978-5-389-08465-0.
- Oleynikov, Alexei (2024). Великое отступление и стабилизация восточного фронта [The Great Retreat and stabilization of the Eastern Front]. Moscow: Вече. ISBN 978-5-4484-4482-1.
- Golovin, Nikolai (2014). Россия в Первой мировой войне [Russia in First World War]. Вече. ISBN 978-5-4444-1667-9.
- Oldenburg, Sergey (2022). Царствование императора Николая 2 [The Reign of Emperor Nicholas 2] (in Russian). Moscow: центрополиграф. ISBN 978-5-227-09905-1.
- Béla, Köpeczi (1998). History of Transylvania. Akadémiai Kiadó. ISBN 978-84-8371-020-3.
- Crampton, R. J. (1994). Eastern Europe in the twentieth century. Routledge. ISBN 978-0-415-05346-4.
- Erlikman, Vadim (2004). Poteri narodonaseleniia v XX veke [Population loss in the 20th century] (in Russian). Spravochnik.
- Sanborn, Josh. "The mobilization of 1914 and the question of the Russian nation: A reexamination." Slavic Review 59.2 (2000): 267–289. online
- Wildman, Allan K. End of the Russian Imperial Army: The Old Army & the Soldiers' Revolt (March–April 1917) (1980).
- Trevelyan, George Macaulay (June 1915). "Austria-Hungary and Serbia". The North American Review 201 (715): 860–868.
- Mamatey, Albert (Oct. 1915). "The Situation in Austria-Hungary". The Journal of Race Development 6 (2): 203–217.
- Williamson, Samuel R. Jr. (1991). Austria-Hungary and the Origins of the First World War. New York: St. Martin's Press.
- Mason, John W. (1985). The Dissolution of the Austro-Hungarian Empire 1867–1918. London: Longman Group Limited.
- Miller, William (1922). The Balkans: Roumania, Bulgaria, Serbia and Montenegro. London: T. Fisher Unwin Ltd.
- Hitchins, Keith (1994). Rumania: 1866–1947. Oxford: Clarendon Press.
- Mosier, John (2002). The Myth of the Great War. New York: Perennial.
- Goldman, Wendy Z. (2002). Women at the Gates: Gender and Industry in Stalin's Russia. Cambridge: Cambridge University Press.
- Coroban, Costel (2012). Potarnichile gri. Spitalele Femeilor Scotiene in Romania (1916–1917). Targoviste: Cetatea de Scaun.
- Dupuy, Trevor Nevitt; Onacewicz, Wlodzimiez (1967). Triumphs and Tragedies in the East, 1915–1917. The Military History of World War I. Vol. 4. New York: Franklin Watts. p. 31. LCCN 67010130.
- A. Zaitsov (1933). "Armed forces". In Malevskii-Malevich, Petr Nikolaevich (ed.). Russia, U.S.S.R.: A Complete Handbook. New York: William Farquhar Payson. JSTOR 2601821.
- Jukes, Geoffrey (2002). Essential Histories: The First World War, The Eastern Front 1914–1918. Oxford: Osprey Publishing.
- Lieven, Dominic (1983). Russia and the Origins of the First World War. New York: St Martin's Press. ISBN 978-0-312-69611-5.
- Liulevicius, Vejas Gabriel (2000). War Land on the Eastern Front: Culture, National Identity, and German Occupation in World War I. Cambridge University Press. ISBN 0-521-66157-9.
- Kowalski, Ronald (1997). The Russian Revolution 1917–1921. London: Routledge. ISBN 0-415-12437-9.
- McRandle, James; Quirk, James (July 2006). "The Blood Test Revisited: A New Look at German Casualty Counts in World War I". The Journal of Military History. 70 (3). Society for Military History: 667–701. doi:10.1353/jmh.2006.0180. S2CID 159930725.
- McCauley, Martin (1975). The Russian Revolution and The Soviet State 1917–1921. London: Macmillan.
- Reese, Roger R. (2023). Russia's Army: A History from the Napoleonic Wars to the War in Ukraine. University of Oklahoma Press. ISBN 978-0-8061-9275-8.
- Roshwald, Aviel; Stites, Richard, eds. (1999). European Culture in the Great War:The Arts, Entertainment and Propaganda 1914–1918. Cambridge: Cambridge University Press. pp. 6,349–358.
- Rothschild, Joseph (1975). East-Central Europe between the Two World Wars. University of Washington Press. ISBN 978-0-295-95350-2.
- Stevenson, David (2017). 1917: War, Peace, and Revolution. Oxford: Oxford University Press. ISBN 978-0-19-100676-0.
- Stone, David R. (2015). The Russian Army in the Great War: The Eastern Front, 1914–1917. Lawrence: University Press of Kansas. ISBN 978-0-7006-3308-1.
- Oxana Nagornaja, Jeffrey Mankoff (2009). "United by Barbed Wire: Russian POWs in Germany, National Stereotypes, and International Relations". Explorations in Russian and Eurasian History 10 (3): 475–498. Retrieved 14 February 2014.
- Vinogradov, V.N (1992). "Romania in the First World War: The Years of Neutrality, 1914–16." The International History Review 14 (3): 452–461.
- Gatrell, Peter (2005). "Prisoners of War on the Eastern Front during World War I". Kritika 6 (3): 557–566. Retrieved 18 March 2014.
- Tucker, Spencer C. (1998). The Great War 1914–18. Bloomington: Indiana University Press. pp. 220–223.
- Борисюк, Андрей (2023). История России, которую приказали забыть. Николай II и его время; [5-е издание]. St. Petersburg: Питер. ISBN 978-5-4484-3841-7.
- Oleynikov, Alexei (2016). Россия-щит Антанты [Russia-Shield of Entente]. Foreword by Nikolai Starikov. St.Petersburg: Piter. ISBN 978-5-496-01795-4.
- Rady, Martyn (2023). Габсбурги власть над миром [The Habsburgs: To Rule the World'] (in Russian). Перевод с Английского–М., Альпина-Нон-Фикшн. ISBN 978-5-00139-266-8.
- Брусилов, Алексей (2023). Мои воспоминания. Из царской армии в Красную (in Russian). Moscow: Москва. ISBN 978-5-04-176827-0.
- Akçakayalioğlu, Albay Cihat (1967). BİRİNCİ DÜNYA HARBİ VII nci Cilt AVRUPA CEPHELERİ (Galiçya Cephesi). Vol. 1. Ankara: Gnkur. Basımevi.
- Haeften, Hans von, ed. (1936). Der Weltkrieg 1914 bis 1918, Die Militärischen Operationen zu Lande, Zehnter Band, Die Operationen des Jahres 1916 bis zum Wechsel in der Obersten Heeresleitung [The World War 1914 to 1918: Military Land Operations, Volume Ten, The Operations of the year 1916 until the Change in the High Command] (in German) (online scan ed.). Berlin: Verlag Ernst Siegfried Mittler und Sohn. OCLC 772473155 – via Die Digitale Landesbibliothek Oberösterreich (The Upper Austrian Provincial Library).
- Keegan, John (2000). The First World War. Toronto: Vintage Canada. ISBN 0-676-97224-1.
- Banac, Ivo (2015). The National Question in Yugoslavia: Origins, History, Politics. Cornell University Press. ISBN 978-1-5017-0193-1.
- Jaques, Tony (2006). Dictionary of Battles. Vol. 1, A–E. Greenwood Press. "While Russian General Nikolai Yudenich seized Erzincan, Ahmet Izzet Pasha's Second Army advanced against the Russian left flank, where his corps cammder Mustafa Kemal seized Bitlis and Mus. Yudenich counter-attacked and, after prolonged combat west of Lake Van, he retook Bitlis and the Turks abandoned Mus before winter ended the fighting."
