= Romanian Black Sea Fleet during World War I =

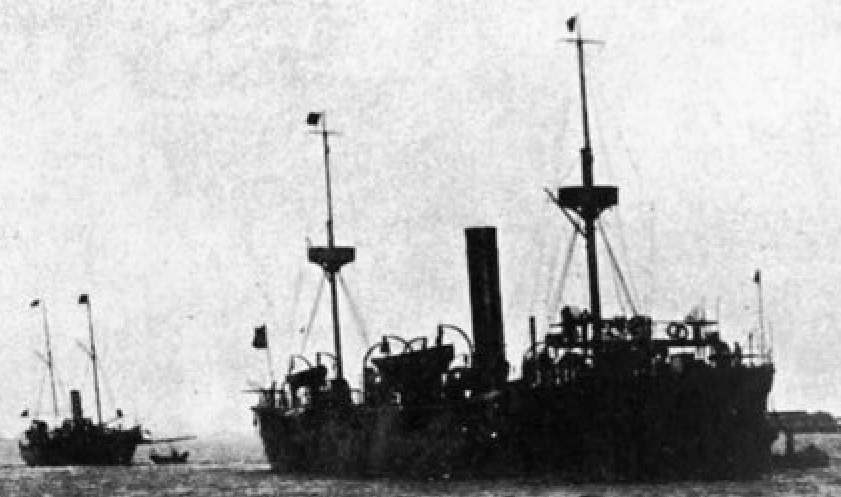
- The minelayer Alexandru cel Bun following behind the protected cruiser Elisabeta
Date	1916–1917
Location	Danube Delta (mainly Sulina)
Result	Romanian victory – Successful defense of Sulina and the Danube Delta throughout the entire Romanian Campaign

Belligerents
Romania	German Empire; Ottoman Empire; Austria-Hungary

Strength
1 cruiser 3 torpedo boats 1 gunboat 1 minelayer 1 brig	1 cruiser 1 submarine 1 monitor Unknown seaplanes Unknown ground forces

Casualties and losses
1 torpedo boat sunk	1 submarine sunk 1 monitor sunk 1 seaplane destroyed 1 seaplane captured (damaged); Unknown ground casualties

During World War I, the Black Sea Fleet of the Romanian Navy fought against the Central Powers forces of the German Empire, the Ottoman Empire and Austria-Hungary. The Romanian warships succeeded in defending the coast of the Danube Delta, corresponding to an area around the port of Sulina, while also aiding in the Delta's defense from inland Central Powers forces.

== History and strength ==
The Romanian Black Sea Fleet was founded in 1890. Its main warships amounted to one protected cruiser, Elisabeta, one armed brig, Mircea, and three Sborul-class torpedo boats. Other important vessels included the sea-going gunboat Grivița and the Romanian Navy's sole proper minelayer, Alexandru cel Bun.

The Black Sea Fleet was neglected for a long-time by the Romanian Command. Its warships were all built between 1880 and 1888, while the Romanian Danube Flotilla was equipped with modern vessels built as late as 1908. The protected cruiser Elisabeta was converted to an anti-aircraft cruiser after the start of the war, her four 120 mm main guns being landed and her four 75 mm secondary guns being modified for anti-aircraft fire. She was also armed with four machine guns and four 356 mm (12 inch) torpedo tubes. The composite brig Mircea was used as a training ship and as such she was only armed with four machine guns. The three Sborul-class torpedo boats were initially armed with two fixed, bow-mounted 14-inch torpedo tubes and two 37 mm (1-pounder) revolving guns. However, during World War I, only Smeul retained her two 37 mm guns. The other two boats in the class, Sborul and Năluca, had their two 37 mm guns replaced by one machine gun during a 1907 refit. The gunboat Grivița was armed with two 57 mm (6-pounder) guns, two 37 mm guns and two machine guns. The minelayer Alexandru cel Bun was armed with two 37 mm guns and two machine guns, in addition to her load of mines.

Number of ships	Total displacement	Artillery pieces (37–75 mm)	Machine guns	Torpedo tubes
7	2,000	12	14	10

== Operations ==
The main Romanian port of Constanța was leased to a Russian naval squadron, headed by the battleship Rostislav. This, combined with the fall of the port to the Central Powers during the Second Battle of Cobadin, rendered the small Northern port of Sulina as the base for the Romanian Black Sea Fleet.

=== Against the German empire ===
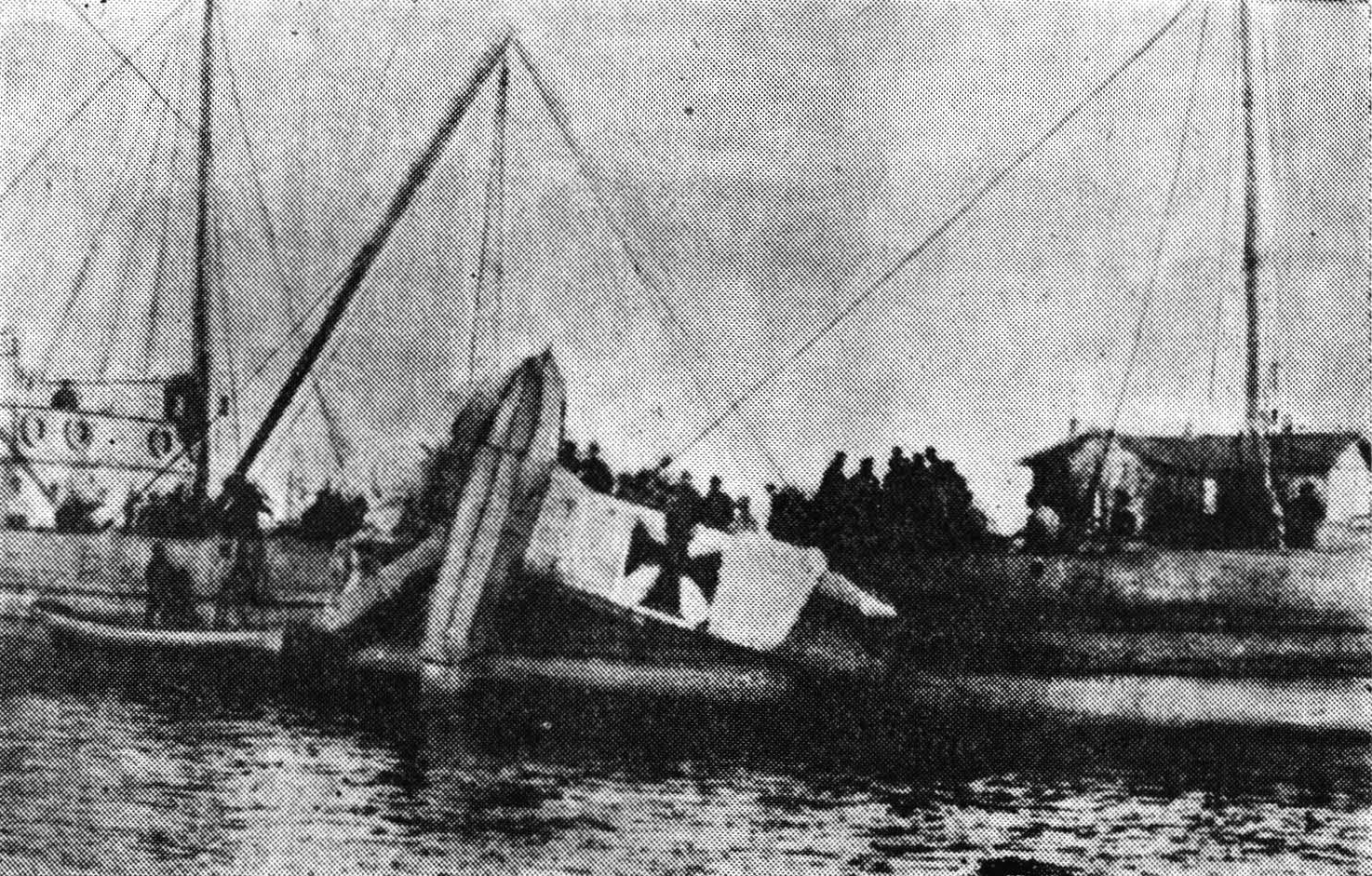
German seaplane shot down at Sulina

After the conquest of Constanța, the Central Powers began using seaplanes for raids on Sulina. On 7 November, Romanian anti-aircraft defenses at Sulina shot down a German Friedrichshafen FF.33 seaplane, killing the commander of the German squadron.

On 13 November 1916, the German minelaying submarine UC-15 set off to lay mines off Sulina. However, she only managed to lay two of her mines, which were discovered and swept in 1918. The U-boat was surprised in shallow waters by the Romanian torpedo boat Smeul and she was subsequently sunk by her own mines.

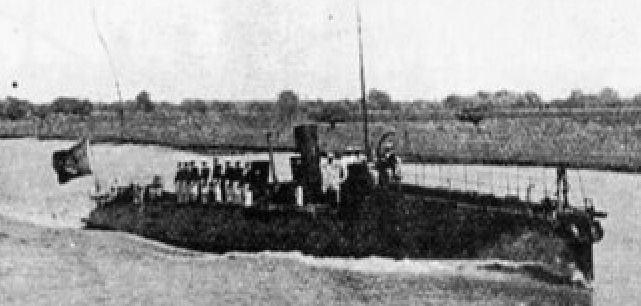
Sborul-class torpedo boat

In the spring of 1917, Smeul came close to being hit by aircraft bombs dropped by a German seaplane. Romanian anti-aircraft fire struck the aircraft, but the German pilot succeeded in landing it on the water. He was subsequently taken prisoner.

=== Against the Ottoman Empire ===
The Romanian torpedo boat Smeul was highly advantaged by her two 37 mm revolving guns, as opposed to her two sisters which were only armed with one machine gun each. For several times, she sailed inland and raided German and Ottoman troops at Tulcea. "We smoked them", her captain used to say.

On 16 April 1917, Smeul departed from Chilia for Ismail, carrying materials, correspondence, a few evacuees, and three French officers commanding the infantry troops at Sulina. She capsized and sank in the Stari-Stambul distributary during a storm with the loss of 18 of her crew, including the French officers present on board. This incident has been incorrectly attributed to mines laid by the Ottoman cruiser Midilli in several English language sources, possibly as a result of wartime propaganda by the Central Powers.

=== Against Austria-Hungary ===
Alexandru cel Bun was the only minelayer of the Romanian Navy. On 22 September 1917, Romania achieved its greatest naval success of the war, when the Austro-Hungarian river monitor SMS Inn struck a Romanian mine and sank near Brăila. She was later salvaged, but was still undergoing repairs when the war ended.
