= Anton Antonovich Kersnovsky =

Russian military historian (1905–1944)

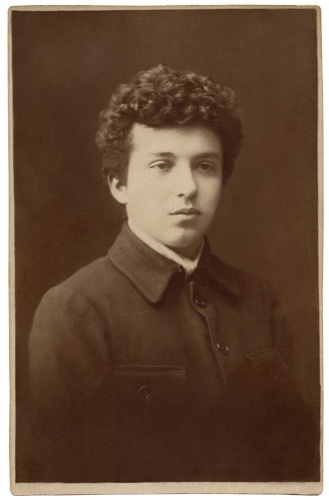
- Anton Kersnovsky during his studies abroad, mid-1920s
- Born: 23 June 1905 Tsepilovo, Soroksky Uyezd, Bessarabian Governorate, Russian Empire
- Died: 24 June 1944 (aged 39) Paris, France
- Occupation: Historian, publicist
- Language: Russian
- Subject: History, military affairs
- Years active: 1927–1944

Signature
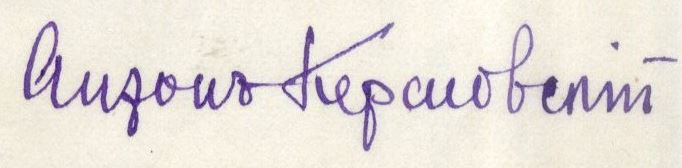

Anton Antonovich Kersnovsky (23 June 1905 – 24 June 1944) was a Russian publicist and military historian.

== Biography ==
Kersnovsky was born in 1905 in the family estate in the village of Tsepilovo near the town of Soroca in Bessarabia. His father, Anton Antonovich Kersnovsky, was a criminologist and investigator at the Odessa Judicial Chamber. His mother, Alexandra Alekseevna Karavasili, was a foreign language teacher. He had Polish roots on his father's side and Greek roots on his mother's side; his sister Evfrosinia wrote in her memoirs that their maternal ancestors included klephts. His paternal grandfather was a colonel and surveyor, while his maternal grandfather was a landowner in Kagul, Alexey Dmitrievich Kara-Vasili. From his gymnasium years, Anton was interested in military affairs, and it was clear that he would follow in the footsteps of his colonel grandfather.

In Odessa, where the Kersnovsky family lived on Marazliivska Street, Kersnovsky, at the age of 13, joined the Volunteer Army while still a gymnasium student. He fought in the war, gained combat experience, and contracted incurable tuberculosis. In 1920, he evacuated from Crimea with the remnants of Wrangel's Russian Army and emigrated to Serbia. He later briefly returned to his native village of Tsepilovo, which had become part of Romania after World War I, but soon left for Austria to continue his education.

In Vienna, Kersnovsky graduated from the Consular Academy. He then moved to France, studied at the university in Dijon, and attended a course at the renowned military school in Saint-Cyr.

In the second half of the 1920s, he settled permanently in Paris. He earned a living through various jobs: giving private lessons, delivering mail, and performing small tasks, living in poverty. In his spare time, he worked in archives, collecting materials and documents for his future work.

Kersnovsky's first published article, On American Artillery, appeared in the Belgrade weekly Russkiy Voennyy Vestnik (from 1928, Tsarskiy Vestnik) on 20 March 1927, when he was not yet twenty-two years old. Its publisher, Rklitsky (later Archbishop Nikon), provided him with the opportunity to publish his works, and by 1940 Kersnovsky had published more than 500 materials there. Initially, he wrote mainly about military history and the contemporary state of armed forces, paying particular attention to the internal and international situation of countries, especially Germany in the early 1930s. In a series of articles, he not only predicted the return of war and the rise of Hitler to power, but also issued a warning: “For us, Russians, it is important not to forget that with the revival of the German army, our recent sworn enemy will rise again from oblivion.”

German specialists also took notice of Kersnovsky's articles, but lacking any information about the author and judging only by the level of his publications, they assumed he was a high-ranking White Army officer from the staff of Denikin or Wrangel. In German military journals, he was referred to as russischer General Kersnovski. Because Kersnovsky lived a reclusive life and mostly sent his articles by mail, very little was known about him. Some émigrés even claimed that Kersnovsky did not exist and that the name was a collective pseudonym used by a group of senior officers. No general or colonel named Kersnovsky was known, although the level of his work suggested at least a General Staff colonel.

Kersnovsky was a monarchist.

From late 1932, Tsarskiy Vestnik began publishing an abridged version of Kersnovsky's Philosophy of War (the complete book with additions was published in 1939). From 1933 to 1938, his major work, History of the Russian Army, was published in four volumes in Belgrade (republished in Russia, including by the publisher Golos in 1992–1994). His two-volume Military Affairs remained unpublished, and several other works survived only in fragmentary mentions.

Shortly before the German invasion of France, Kersnovsky was drafted into the French army. In February 1940, during the Phoney War, he wrote: “It is sad and unjust to die on foreign soil and for a foreign land when I wished to be of use to my homeland.”

He was soon reported killed near Dommartin, but this proved incorrect; he had only been seriously wounded. After recovering, Kersnovsky returned to his attic room in Paris, where he lived under German occupation for the rest of his life.

Kersnovsky died on 24 June 1944, one day after his 39th birthday, from complications of long-standing tuberculosis contracted during the Russian Civil War. He was buried in Paris at the Sainte-Geneviève-des-Bois Russian Cemetery in a shared grave with his wife.

== Family ==
His wife, Galina Viktorovna (née Ryshkova), was the sister of the military writer Evgeny Tarussky, known among the circles of the first-wave Russian émigré community.

The Kersnovsky family lived for a long time in a small attic room in Paris.

On the day of Anton Kersnovsky's death, Galina Viktorovna, unable to bear the loss of her husband, committed suicide by jumping from the window of their attic room.

His mother Alexandra (his father died in 1936) and his sister Evfrosinia remained in Bessarabia, which was annexed to the Soviet Union in 1940. His mother moved to Romania, while his sister was subjected to repression.

His mother died in 1964 and was buried in Yessentuki. His sister died there in 1994, but before her death, she arranged for soil from Anton's grave to be brought to their mother's grave.

== Significance of works ==
Anton Kersnovsky is considered one of the most significant Russian military historians of the 20th century. Without being an officer of the Russian General Staff and without having received a formal academic education, he independently created his History of the Russian Army, which occupies an important place among fundamental works on Russian military history. Particular value is attributed to his works due to their originality and breadth of perspective, as well as his understanding of Russian geopolitics in the tradition of N. Ya. Danilevsky.

Long before the outbreak of World War II, Kersnovsky predicted its inevitability. In his writings, he argued that war is an inherent and organic part of human civilization. From this followed his deep contempt for pacifists, who were gaining influence in Europe at the time and, in his view, became one of the causes of the total defeat of European armies under the blows of the Wehrmacht.

In his second major work, Philosophy of War, Kersnovsky wrote that in order to achieve universal peace among nations, it would be necessary “first of all to forbid these nations the source of conflicts political activity. And in order to forbid politics, it is necessary to forbid the fundamental cause that continuously generates it the ongoing (accelerating) development of human society, primarily spiritual, then intellectual, and finally material and physical.” From a practical point of view, these measures would imply banning printing and literacy altogether (a phenomenon of the same logical order as prohibitions on poison gases and alcohol, such as enforced universal sobriety). This would be followed by “Malthusian” measures to limit the human population, including compulsory castration of all newborn infants and other similar measures, after which “moral disarmament” and the abolition of war would be achieved fully and without particular difficulty. As a result, conflicts would soon disappear but so would the cause that generates them: life itself.

== Works ==
- On American Artillery (1927)
- The German Cavalry Division in Wartime (1927–1932)
- The Essence of the French Military Reform (1927–1932)
- Organization of the Armored Forces of the Red Army (1927–1932)
- Armament of Italy (1927–1932)
- The Japanese Army (1927–1932)
- A Missed Opportunity (1927–1932)
- Towards a Second Civil War (1927–1932)
- Militarization of the Country (1927–1932)
- Our Future Small Army (1927–1932)
- Our Future Officer Corps (1927–1932)
- Philosophy of War (1932–1939)
- History of the Russian Army in 4 volumes (1933–1938):
  - V. Khlodovsky, ed. (1992). From Narva to Paris, 1700–1814. Vol. 1. Commentary by S. Nelipovich. Moscow: Golos. p. 304. ISBN 5-7055-0864-6.
  - V. Khlodovsky, ed. (1993). From the Capture of Paris to the Conquest of Central Asia, 1814–1881. Vol. 2. Commentary by S. Nelipovich. Moscow: Golos. p. 334. ISBN 5-7117-0058-8.
  - V. Khlodovsky, ed. (1994). 1881–1915. Vol. 3. Commentary by S. Nelipovich. Moscow: Golos. p. 349. ISBN 5-7117-0180-0.
  - V. Khlodovsky, ed. (1994). 1915–1917. Vol. 4. Commentary by S. Nelipovich. Moscow: Golos. p. 368. ISBN 5-7117-0014-6.
- Military Affairs in 2 volumes (1941–1944, unpublished)
- Russian Strategy in Examples
- The Collapse of German Military Doctrine in 1914 (1941–1944)
- Synthetic Overview of Modern Campaigns (1939–1944, unfinished)
