= Sergei Sergeyevich Oldenburg =

Russian bureaucrat and biographer (1888 – 1940)

Sergei Sergeyevich Oldenburg (Russian: Серге́й Серге́евич Ольденбу́рг; 29 June 1888 - 28 April 1940) was a bureaucrat and biographer from Imperial Russia. He wrote a comprehensive account of Tsar Nicholas II of Russia and his reign from an apologetic, conservative and monarchist perspective.

== Biography ==
Sergei Sergeyevich Oldenburg was born on 29 June 1888 in Malaya Vishera, Imperial Russia. His father, Sergei Fedorovich Oldenburg, was a famed academic and Orientalist who specialized in Buddhist studies. His mother, Alexandra Pavlovna Oldenburg (? - 1891), née Timofeva, was a graduate from the Mathematics Department of the Pedagogical Courses. He studied law at the Imperial Moscow University, and later worked in the Russian Ministry of Finance. Writing for the magazine Russkaya mysl (Russian Thought) as a member of the White movement, he correctly predicted the split between the Bolshevik and Menshevik factions as well as the reasons which led to it, as noted by Lenin himself in his 1922 Testament.

The first volume of his account of Tsar Nicholas II written in Russian was published in 1939 in Belgrade, while the second was published posthumously a decade later in Munich. The first edition published in Russia was after the Soviet collapse in 1991. English translations were published from 1975 to 1978 by Academic International Press with a preface by Patrick J. Rollins, a professor of history at Old Dominion University. Sergei Sergeyevich Oldenburg died at the age of 51 in Paris on 28 April 1940, survived by his daughter Zoé Oldenbourg and wife Ada Dimitrievna Starynkevich (1892 - 1946).

The first volume of his account, starting from the Coronation of Tsar Nicholas II and ending at the Coup of June 1907, is noted by the historian Michael Karpovich to be very critical of Sergei Witte, Vyacheslav von Plehve and the Russification of Finland, while being favorable towards Pyotr Stolypin. The second volume covers the events from 1907 to 1914, starting with the Russo-Japanese War and ending with the change in the electoral law on June 16, 1907. The last volume reviewed the events of World War I, ending with the Russian Revolution.

The main difference in Oldenburg's accounts was his portrayal of the Tsar Nicholas as a strong willed ruler and not a weakling, as most authors do. However, this point of view is becoming less relevant and Oldenburg's views have recently been supported by more Russian historians. The historian A. M. Nikolaieff makes note of Oldenburg's treatment of the Treaty of Portsmouth, where the Tsar refused to pay a monetary settlement to Japan, despite being counselled to do so by Witte. Oldenburg also writes about the Tsar's support for the tentative abolition of the Obshchina (commune system), and for the introduction of the gold standard.

== Works ==
- Tsarstovanie Imperatora Nikolaia II (The Last Tsar: Nicholas II, His Reign and His Russia): vols. I, II, III and IV. English translations: Volume 1 ISBN 9780875690636. Volume 2 ISBN 9780875690681. Volume 3 ISBN 9780875690735. Volume 4 ISBN 9780875690742.
- Le Coup d'état Bolcheviste, 20 octobre-3 décembre 1917, Recueil des Documents Relatifs à la Prise du Pouvoir par les Bolchevistes (The Bolshevik Coup d'état, October 20-December 3, 1917, Collection of Documents Relating to the Seizure of Power by the Bolsheviks). Payot, Paris, 1929. OCLC 154257635.
- Экономическое положеніе и общественные классы Совѣтской Россіи (Economic Situation and Public Classes of Soviet Russia). Pridvornai︠a︡ tip. Akt︠s︡īon. o-vo, Sofīi︠a︡, 1921. OCLC 26543120

== Bibliography ==
- Mosolov, А. (2022). При дворе последнего царя. Воспоминания начальника дворцовой канцелярии [At the court of the last tsar. Memoirs of the head of the Palace Office] (in Russian). ISBN 978-5-9524-5807-9.
- Борисюк, Андрей (2023). История России, которую приказали забыть. Николай II и его время; [5-е издание] [Andrey Borisyuk: The History of Russia, which was Ordered to be Forgotten. Nicholas II and his Times] (in Russian) (5th ed.). St. Petersburg: Питер. ISBN 978-5-4484-3841-7.
