= Assassination attempts on Adolf Hitler =

This is an incomplete list of documented attempts to assassinate Adolf Hitler.

All attempts occurred in Nazi Germany except where noted. At least 42 plots have been uncovered by historians; the total number of plots is uncertain as there may be undocumented cases.

Date	Location	Attempted by	Summary
November 4, 1921	Hofbräuhaus	Unknown	Hitler was giving a speech on the topic "Who are the murderers?" after the assassination attempt on the SPD politician Erhard Auer when the meeting degenerated into a full scale brawl with political opponents. An opponent targeted two pistol shots towards Hitler but missed. Hitler later dubbed this event in Mein Kampf as the "baptism of fire" for his paramilitary forces.
1932	Hotel Kaiserhof (Berlin)	Unknown	Hitler and several members of his staff fell ill after dining at the revered Hotel Kaiserhof in Berlin. Poisoning was suspected, but no arrests were made. Hitler himself seemed least affected by the alleged poisoning, possibly due to his vegetarian diet.
February 9, 1933	Berlin	Ludwig Aßner	Ludwig Aßner, a German politician and member of the Bavarian State Parliament, sent a poisoned letter to Hitler from France. An acquaintance of Aßner warned Hitler and the letter was intercepted.
1934	Berlin	Beppo Römer	Freikorps member Beppo Römer vowed to assassinate Hitler as revenge for the Night of the Long Knives but was turned over to the Gestapo before any concrete plan could be made. He was imprisoned at Dachau until 1939. Römer was arrested once again for anti-Nazi activities and eventually executed at Brandenburg-Görden Prison in 1944.
1934	Berlin	Helmut Mylius	Dr. Helmut Mylius, head of the right-wing Radical Middle Class Party (Radikale Mittelstandspartei), had 160 men infiltrate the SS and begin gathering information on Hitler's movements. The conspiracy was uncovered by the Gestapo and the conspirators arrested. Mylius escaped arrest through the aid of influential friends, including Field Marshal Erich von Manstein.
1934	Berlin	Edgar Jung	The writer Edgar Jung, who due to his occupation as the speech writer of Hitler's conservative Vice-Chancellor Franz von Papen had the opportunity to get close to Hitler, during the Spring of 1934 planned to shoot him as a first step of a scheme envisioned by himself and some associates to overthrow the Nazi Government. However, some of Jung's confidantes convinced him not to go through with his plan, fearing that being killed in an assassination might turn Hitler into a martyr and may thus render a dead Hitler even more dangerous than a living one. Jung was arrested by the Gestapo on June 25, 1934, in his Berlin apartment and murdered in a forest North of the city during the night of June 30 to July 1, 1934.
1934–1939	Charlottenburger Chaussee, Berlin	Noel Mason-MacFarlane	Lieutenant-Colonel Noel Mason-Macfarlane, military attaché to the British Embassy in Berlin, did not trust Hitler and tinkered with the notion that it might pay off to contrive Hitler's assassination. It could have been achieved by sniper rifle-shot from Mason-Macfarlane's drawing room which overlooked the Charlottenburger Chaussee where there was a saluting base podium from which Hitler received the salute from the German armed forces during his birthday parade on 20 April. When Mason-Macfarlane proposed this plan to his superiors, it was turned down. The British Foreign Secretary, Lord Halifax argued that "We have not reached that stage ... when we have to use assassination as a substitute for diplomacy".
1935	Berlin	Marwitz group	Several officials in the German Foreign Office attempted to instigate an army coup against Hitler; they distributed a letter asserting that "The oath of allegiance to Hitler has lost its meaning since he is ready to sacrifice Germany", and that "now was the time to act."
1935	Berlin	Paul Josef Stuermer	Dr. Paul Joseph Stuermer led a resistance group composed of several officers, university professors, businessmen, and government workers. The group assisted in several assassination attempts including Beppo Römer's attempt.
December 20, 1936	Nuremberg	Helmut Hirsch	Helmut Hirsch, a German Jew and a member of the Strasserist Black Front, was tasked with planting two suitcases filled with explosives at the Nazi party headquarters in Nuremberg. The plot was revealed to the Gestapo by a double agent and Hirsch was executed by guillotine on June 4, 1937.
1937	Berlin	Josef Thomas	On November 26, mental patient Josef Thomas, who traveled from Elberfeld to Berlin to shoot Hitler and air force commander Hermann Göring, was arrested by the Gestapo after he confessed his intent.
1937	Berlin	Unknown man in SS uniform	An unidentified man in SS uniform reportedly tried to kill Hitler during a rally at the Berlin Sportpalast.
September 28, 1938	Berlin	Hans Oster, Helmuth Groscurth	Generalmajor Hans Oster and other high-ranking conservatives in the Wehrmacht formed a plan to overthrow Hitler if he declared war on Czechoslovakia. Forces controlled by the plotters would storm the Reich Chancellery, arrest or assassinate Hitler, take control of the government, and restore the exiled Wilhelm II as Emperor. The plan, that relied upon British support against the Nazis, was abandoned after Britain and France agreed to German annexation of Sudetenland in the Munich Agreement, neutralizing the immediate risk of war. Many of the conspirators later took part in the 1944 20 July Plot. Main article: Oster Conspiracy
November 9, 1938	Munich	Maurice Bavaud	Swiss theology student Maurice Bavaud posed as a reporter and planned to shoot Hitler from the reviewing stand as he passed through the parade. His view of Hitler was blocked by the unwitting crowd and he was forced to abandon the plan. He then attempted to follow Hitler but failed. As a stowaway on a train on his way back to Paris he was discovered by a train conductor and turned over to the Gestapo. Bavaud was executed by guillotine at Berlin's Plötzensee Prison on the morning of May 14, 1941.
October 5, 1939	Warsaw	Michał Karaszewicz-Tokarzewski, Service for Poland's Victory	General Michał Karaszewicz-Tokarzewski and other members of the Polish Army attempted to detonate hidden explosives during Hitler's victory parade in Warsaw. 500 kg of TNT were concealed in a ditch, ready to be detonated by Polish sappers. However, at the last moment, the parade was diverted and the saboteurs missed their target.
November 8, 1939	Munich	Georg Elser	German carpenter Georg Elser placed a time-bomb at the Bürgerbräukeller in Munich, where Hitler was due to give his annual speech in commemoration of the Beer Hall Putsch. Hitler left earlier than expected and the bomb detonated, killing eight and injuring sixty-two others. Following the attempt, Elser was held as a prisoner for over five years until he was executed at the Dachau concentration camp less than a month before the surrender of Nazi Germany.
1939	Berlin	Erich Kordt	German diplomat and resistance fighter Erich Kordt hatched an assassination plot along with officer Hasso von Etzdorf to plant explosives, but the plan was abandoned after the security restrictions following Georg Elser's attempt to kill Hitler made the acquisition and concealment of the necessary explosives too dangerous.
1941–1943 (several)	Berlin	Beppo Römer	Beppo Römer, along with several co-conspirators of the resistance group Solf Circle, plotted once again to assassinate Hitler. He obtained funds from co-conspirator Nikolaus von Halem and kept track of Hitler's movements through a contact at the Berlin City Commandment. However, before an opportunity presented itself, the Gestapo unraveled the plot. Römer was sentenced to death on June 16, 1944 and executed on September 25 of that year at Brandenburg-Görden Prison in Brandenburg an der Havel. Von Halem was sentenced to death as well and executed on October 9, 1944.
1943	Walki, Ukraine	Hubert Lanz, Hans Speidel, Hyazinth Graf Strachwitz	General der Gebirgstruppe Hubert Lanz and Generals Hans Speidel, Hyacinth Graf Strachwitz, and Paul Loehning planned to arrest or kill Hitler during his visit to Army Detachment Kempf in Ukraine. Strachwitz was to surround Hitler and his escorts with his tanks. Lanz stated that he would have then arrested Hitler, and in the event of resistance, Strachwitz's tanks would have killed the entire group. Hitler cancelled the visit and the plan was dropped. Lanz told of this plot after the war. However Strachwitz's cousin, Rudolf Christoph Freiherr von Gersdorff, who attempted to assassinate Hitler in 1943, said Strachwitz had expressed the belief to him several times that killing Hitler would have constituted murder. That is, Strachwitz was too much a Prussian officer to consider assassinating Hitler, which suggests that the plot never existed.
March 13, 1943	Flight from Smolensk	Henning von Tresckow, Fabian von Schlabrendorff	On the return flight from a front visit, Hitler visited the headquarters of the Army Group Center in Smolensk. During the visit there were several attempts on his life: Under the direction of Major Georg von Boeselager, several officers were to intercept and assassinate Hitler in a grove on his way from the airport to the headquarters. Hitler was guarded by an armed SS escort; the plan was then dropped.; During lunchtime, Tresckow, Boeselager, and others planned to get up at a sign and fire pistols at Hitler. The commander-in-chief of the Army Group, Field Marshal Günther von Kluge, knew about the plan but did not intervene. However, the plan was abandoned when it became clear that Hitler would not be present. Kluge forbade the attack, citing his fear of a possible civil war erupting between the SS and the army.; In a last-ditch attempt, Fabian von Schlabrendorff gave a time bomb camouflaged as a package of two liqueur bottles to an officer in Hitler's entourage, as a supposed gift to a friend in Germany. The bomb was supposed to explode on the return flight over Poland. The package was placed in the hold of the aircraft, where it iced up, causing the detonator to fail. Realizing the failure, Schlabrendorff immediately flew to Germany and recovered the package before it was discovered.
March 21, 1943	Berlin	Rudolf Christoph Freiherr von Gersdorff	After becoming close friends with leading Army Group Center conspirator Colonel (later Major-General) Henning von Tresckow, Generalmajor Gersdorff agreed to join the conspiracy to kill Hitler in order to save Germany. After Tresckow's elaborate plan to assassinate Hitler on March 13, 1943 failed, Gersdorff declared himself ready to participate in an assassination attempt that would entail his own death. On March 21, 1943, Hitler visited the Zeughaus Berlin, the old armory on Unter den Linden, to inspect captured Soviet weapons. A group of top Nazi and leading military officials – among them Hermann Göring, Heinrich Himmler, Field Marshal Wilhelm Keitel, and Grand Admiral Karl Dönitz – were present as well. As an expert, Gersdorff was to guide Hitler on a tour of the exhibition. Moments after Hitler entered the museum, Gersdorff set off two ten-minute delayed fuses on explosive devices hidden in his coat pockets. His plan was to throw himself around Hitler in a death embrace. A detailed plan for a coup d'état had been worked out and was ready to go but, contrary to expectations, Hitler raced through the museum in less than ten minutes. After Hitler had left the building, Gersdorff defused the devices in a public bathroom "at the last second". After the attempt, he was transferred back to the Eastern Front, where he managed to evade suspicion.
November 16, 1943	Wolf's Lair	Axel Freiherr von dem Bussche-Streithorst	Encouraged by Claus Stauffenberg, Major Axel von dem Bussche agreed to carry out a suicide bombing to kill Hitler. Bussche, who was over two meters tall, blonde and blue-eyed, exemplified the Nazi "Nordic ideal" and was chosen to model the Army's new winter uniform in front of Hitler. In his backpack, Bussche concealed a landmine, which he planned to detonate while embracing Hitler. The viewing was canceled after the rail car containing the new uniforms was destroyed in an Allied air raid on Berlin.
February 1944	Wolf's Lair	Ewald-Heinrich von Kleist-Schmenzin	Ewald von Kleist attempted a scheme similar to von dem Bussche. The uniform inspection was again postponed and eventually cancelled by Hitler.
March 11, 1944	Berghof	Eberhard von Breitenbuch	On March 9, 1944, the German resistance member Busch and his aides were summoned to brief Hitler at the Berghof in Bavaria on March 11. In discussion with Tresckow, Breitenbuch declined to attempt a suicide bombing. Instead he would try to shoot Hitler in the head with a 7.65 mm Browning pistol concealed in his trouser pocket. Busch and Breitenbuch travelled on a Kondor aircraft to Bavaria and were allowed into the Berghof. SS guards had been ordered – earlier that day – not to permit aides into the conference room with Hitler, preventing Breitenbuch's attempt.
July 20, 1944	Wolf's Lair	Claus von Stauffenberg	Main article: 20 July plot Claus von Stauffenberg attempted to kill Hitler by detonating an explosive hidden in a briefcase but it failed due to the location of the bomb at the time of detonation, the blast only dealing minor injuries to Hitler.

== See also ==
- Operation Foxley (1944)
- Operation Spark (1941)
- Operation Valkyrie
- Operation Zeppelin
