= August von Mackensen =

German field marshal (1849–1945)

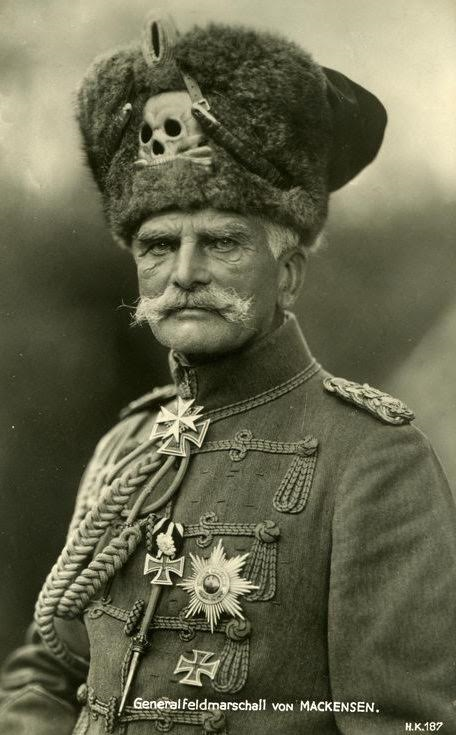
- von Mackensen, c. 1914–15
- Born: Anton Ludwig Friedrich August Mackensen; 6 December 1849; Haus Leipnitz, Province of Saxony, Kingdom of Prussia, German Confederation
- Died: 8 November 1945 (aged 95); Habighorst, Province of Hanover, Allied-occupied Germany
- Relatives: Eberhard von Mackensen (son); Hans Georg von Mackensen (son)
- Military career
- Allegiance: Kingdom of Prussia; North German Confederation; German Empire; Weimar Republic
- Branch: Prussian Army; Imperial German Army; Reichsheer
- Service years: 1869–1920
- Rank: Generalfeldmarschall
- Nickname: "The Last Hussar"
- Commands: Army Group Mackensen
- Conflicts: See battles: Franco-Prussian War; World War I; Eastern Front; Russian invasion of East Prussia; Battle of Gumbinnen; Battle of Tannenberg; First Battle of the Masurian Lakes; Battle of the Vistula River; Battle of Łódź; Gorlice–Tarnów offensive; Great Retreat (Russia); Balkan Campaign; Serbian campaign (1915); Great Retreat (Serbia); Romanian Campaign; Romanian campaign (1916); Dobruja Campaign; Battle of Turtucaia; Second Battle of the Jiu Valley; Battle of Bucharest; Romanian campaign (1917); Battle of Mărășești
- Awards: Grand Cross of the Iron Cross; Pour le Mérite with Oak Leaves; Order of the Black Eagle

Signature
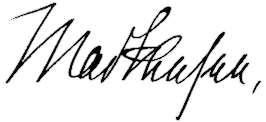

Anton Ludwig Friedrich August Mackensen (ennobled as von Mackensen in 1899; 6 December 1849 – 8 November 1945), was a German field marshal. He commanded Army Group Mackensen during World War I (1914–1918) and became one of the German Empire's most prominent and competent military leaders. After the armistice of 11 November 1918, the victorious Allies interned Mackensen in Serbia for a year. In 1920, he retired from the army. In 1933 Hermann Göring made him a Prussian state councillor. During the Nazi era (1933–1945), Mackensen remained a committed monarchist and sometimes appeared at official functions in his World War I uniform. Senior Nazi Party members suspected him of disloyalty, but nothing was proven against him.

== Early life and career ==
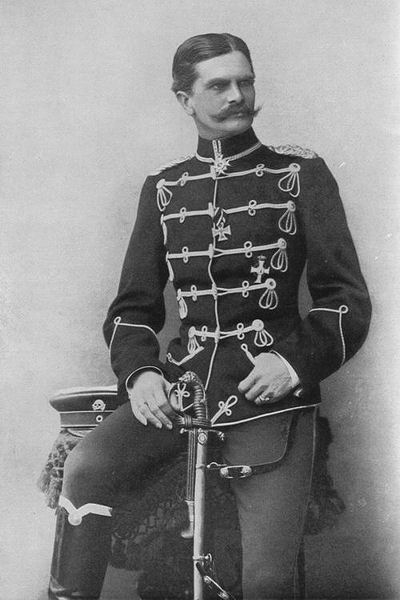
Mackensen, c. 1880

Anton Ludwig Friedrich August Mackensen was born on 6 December 1849 in Haus Leipnitz, near the village of Dahlenberg (today part of Trossin) in the Prussian Province of Saxony, to Ludwig and Marie Louise Mackensen. His father, a farm secretary, sent him to a Realgymnasium in Halle in 1865, seemingly in the hope that his eldest son would follow him in his profession.

Mackensen began his military service in 1869 as a volunteer with the Prussian 2nd Life Hussars Regiment (Leib-Husaren-Regiment Nr. 2). During the Franco-Prussian War of 1870–1871, he was promoted to second lieutenant and won the Iron Cross Second Class for leading a charge on a reconnaissance patrol north of Orléans. After the war, he left the service and studied at Halle University but returned to the German Army in 1873 with his old regiment.

He married Doris (Dorothea) von Horn, the sister of a slain comrade, in 1879. Her father, Karl von Horn, was the influential Oberpräsident of East Prussia. They had two daughters and three sons. He found a mentor in the War Minister Julius von Verdy du Vernois. In 1891, Mackensen was appointed to the General Staff in Berlin and bypassed the usual three-year preparation in the War Academy. His chief, Helmuth von Moltke, found him a "lovable character".

Mackensen was recalled from the regiment to serve as an adjutant to the next chief, Alfred von Schlieffen (in office 1891–1906), whom he regarded as a great instructor on how to lead armies of millions.

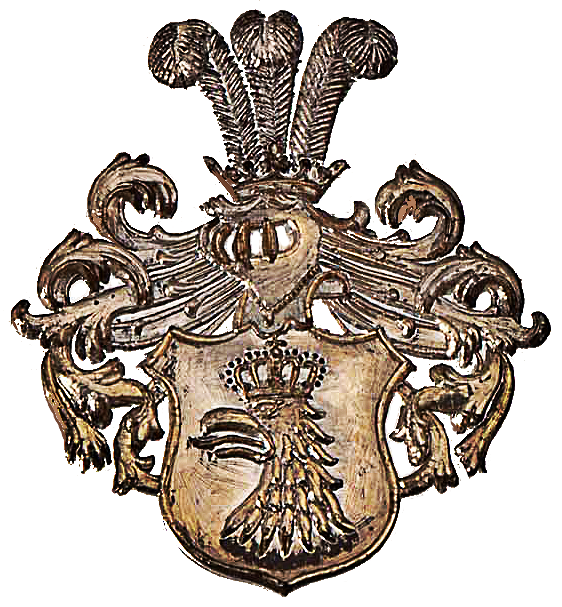
Mackensen's coat of arms (uncoloured)

Mackensen impressed Kaiser Wilhelm II, who ordered that he be given command of the 1st Life Hussars Regiment (Leib-Husaren-Regiment Nr. 1) from 17 June 1893, and when he left its command on 27 January 1898 he was retained à la suite, often wearing the distinctive death's head uniform thereafter. Mackensen, then became adjutant to Wilhelm II, the first commoner to hold that position. For the next three-and-a-half years, he shadowed the Kaiser and met the high and mighty of Germany, the rest of Europe and the Near East. His sons were schooled with the Kaiser's. Mackensen was ennobled on the Kaiser's 40th birthday, 27 January 1899, and became August von Mackensen.

Next, he received the command of the newly created Life Hussar Brigade (Leib-Husaren-Brigade) from 1901 to 1903, and from 1903 to 1908, he commanded the 36th Division in Danzig.

His wife died in 1905, and two years later, he married Leonie von der Osten, who was 22 years old. When Schlieffen retired in 1906, Mackensen was considered as a possible successor, but the position went to Helmuth von Moltke the Younger. In 1908, Mackensen was given command of the XVII Army Corps, headquartered in Danzig. The Crown Prince was placed under his command, and the Kaiser asked Mackensen to keep an eye on the young man and to teach him to ride properly.

== First World War ==
=== Eastern Front ===
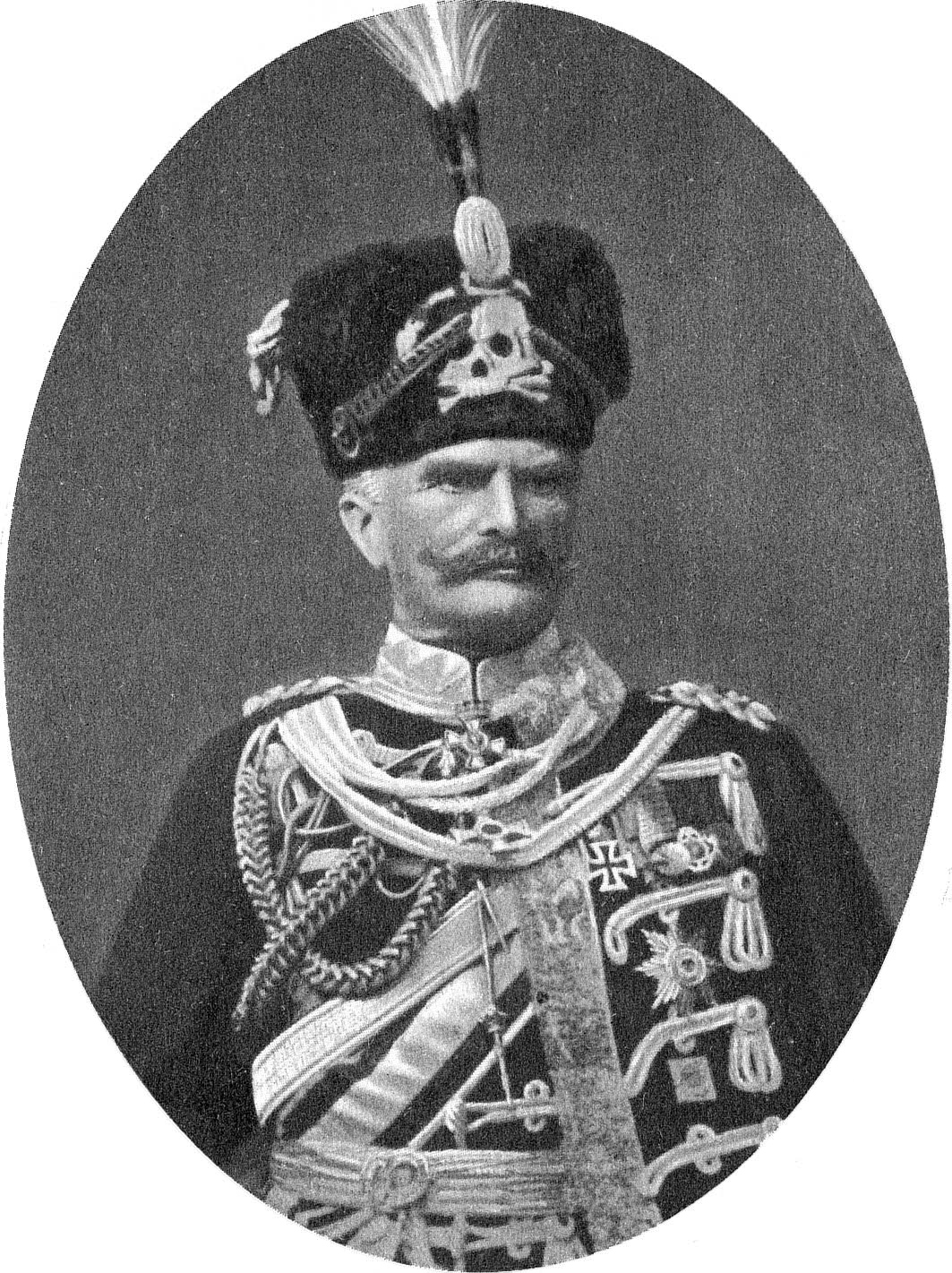
Mackensen in his Life Hussar uniform with his iconic Totenkopf fur busby c. 1915

At the outbreak of war in 1914, Mackensen, aged 65, commanded the XVII Army Corps, which became part of the German Eighth Army in East Prussia, under General Maximilian von Prittwitz, and then, 21 days later, under General Paul von Hindenburg. Mackensen had his corps moving out on a 25 km march to the Rominte River within fifty minutes of receiving his orders on the afternoon of 19 August 1914, after the Imperial Russian Army had invaded East Prussia. He led the XVII Corps in the battles of Gumbinnen (20 August 1914), Tannenberg (23 to 30 August 1914) and the First Battle of the Masurian Lakes (2 to 16 September 1914), which drove the invading Russians out of most of East Prussia.

On 2 November 1914, Mackensen took over command of the Ninth Army from Hindenburg, who became Supreme Commander East (Oberbefehlshaber Ost). On 27 November 1914, Mackensen was awarded the Pour le Mérite, Prussia's highest military order, for successful battles around Warsaw and Łódź.

By April 1915, the Russians had conquered much of western Galicia and were pushing toward Hungary. In response to the desperate pleas from Vienna, German Chief of Staff Erich von Falkenhayn agreed to an offensive against the Russian flank by an Austro-German army under a German commander. The reluctant Austro-Hungarian supreme command agreed that the tactful Mackensen was the best choice for commanding the coalition army. Army Group Mackensen (Heeresgruppe Mackensen) was established, containing a new German Eleventh Army, also under his command, and the Austro-Hungarian Fourth Army. As chief of staff, he was assigned Hans von Seeckt, who described Mackensen as an amiable, "hands-on commander with the instincts of a hunter". His army group, which had an overwhelming advantage in artillery, smashed through the Russian lines between Gorlice and Tarnow and then continued eastward. Never giving the Russians time to establish an effective defence, it retook most of eastern Galicia, recapturing Przemyśl and Lemberg. The joint operation was a great victory for the Central Powers, which advanced 310 km (186 mi), and the Russians pulled out of all of Poland soon afterward.

Mackensen was awarded oak leaves to his Pour le Mérite on 3 June 1915 and was promoted to field marshal on 22 June. He also received the Order of the Black Eagle, Prussia's highest-ranking order of knighthood, as well as numerous honours from other German states – including the Grand Cross of the Military Order of Max Joseph, the highest military honor of the Kingdom of Bavaria, on 4 June 1915 – and from Germany's allies.

=== Serbian campaign ===
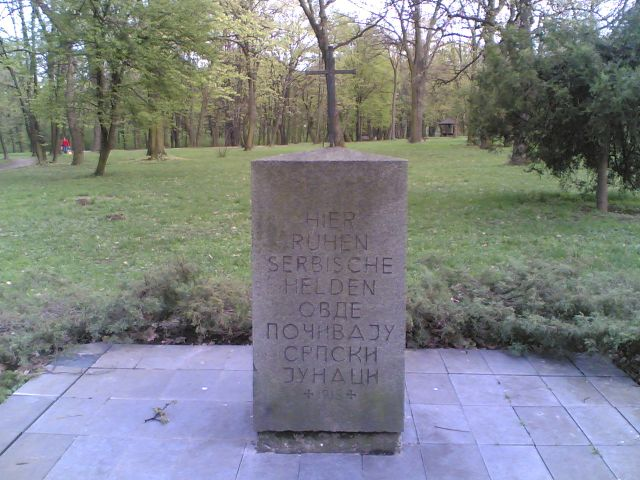
World War I monument erected by Mackensen to the Serbian defenders of Belgrade. The inscription reads "Here Rest Serbian Heroes" in German and Serbian.

In October 1915, a new Army Group Mackensen (Heeresgruppe Mackensen, which included the German Eleventh Army, the Austro-Hungarian Third Army and the Bulgarian First Army), launched a renewed campaign against Serbia. The campaign impacted military resistance in Serbia but failed to remove the Royal Serbian Army, half of which managed to retreat to Entente-held ports in Albania and, after recuperation and rearmament by the French and the Italians, re-entered fighting on the Macedonian front. When Mackensen returned to Vienna, he was honoured by a dinner and a personal audience with Emperor Franz Joseph I of Austria and was decorated with the jeweled Military Merit Cross 1st Class with Diamonds, an uncommon award for a foreigner.

Mackensen appears to have had great respect for the Serbian Army and Serbs generally. Before departing to the Serbian front in 1915, he had spoken to his men:

You are not going to the Italian, Russian, or French front. You are going into battle against a new enemy - dangerous, tough, fearless, and sharp. You are going to the Serbian front and Serbia. Serbs are people who love their freedom, and who will fight to the last man. Be careful this small enemy does not cast a shadow on your glory and compromise your successes.

=== Romanian campaign ===
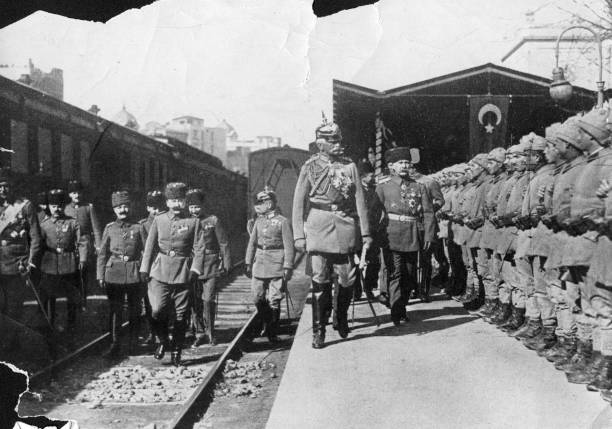
Mackensen inspects soldiers of the Ottoman Empire, June 1916

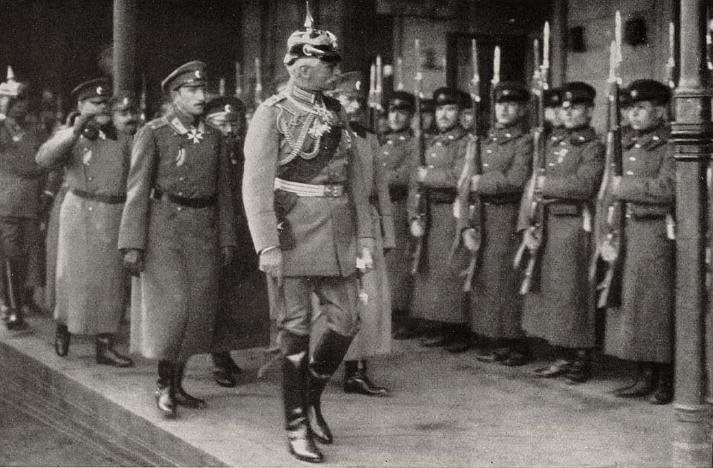
Mackensen reviewing Bulgarian troops followed by Crown Prince Boris (c. 1916)

After Romania declared war on Austria-Hungary on 15 August 1916, Mackensen was given command of a multinational army, with Colonel Emil Hell as chief of staff, of Bulgarians, Ottomans, Austro-Hungarians and Germans. It assembled in northern Bulgaria and then advanced into Dobruja. By 8 September, it had taken the two major forts on the right bank of the Danube, the first in a single day by a force that was outnumbered by the besieged, who were overwhelmed by Mackensen's artillery. Then, a German and Austro-Hungarian army group that was commanded by Falkenhayn broke into Wallachia through the Vulkan Pass in the Transylvanian Carpathian Mountains while Mackensen crossed the Danube by seizing bridgeheads on the left bank to shield the Austro-Hungarian engineers who built the long pontoon bridge. The Romanian Army and its Russian allies were forced back between those pincers. After three months of war, two thirds of Romania was occupied by the Central Powers. The capital of Romania, Bucharest, was captured by the Central Powers on 6 December 1916, on his 67th birthday. He rode in on a white horse and moved into the Romanian royal palace. For that performance, on 9 January 1917, Mackensen was awarded the Grand Cross of the Iron Cross and became one of only five recipients of that honour in the First World War. Since he now wore every Prussian medal, the Kaiser decided to name a battle cruiser after him, which became the first in a new class. Mackensen became the military governor of the large part of Romania (mainly Wallachia) that was occupied by the Central Powers. He proposed making a German prince the King of Romania, but the initiative fell through. His last campaign was an attempt to destroy the Romanian Army, which had been reorganised.

During the Battle of Mărășești, both sides took heavy losses, but the Romanian Army emerged victorious. Mackensen maintained that he had never been defeated in battle, and he surely was the most consistently successful senior general on either side in World War I. By December 1917, the Russian Army had collapsed, and the Romanian Armed Forces were forced to sign the Armistice of Focșani, followed by the Treaty of Bucharest.

On 11 November 1918, Germany signed an armistice with the Allies under which it had to immediately withdraw all German troops in Romania, the Ottoman Empire, Austria-Hungary and the Russian Empire back to German territory and Allies to have access to those countries.

== Postwar ==
After the armistice, he and the 200,000 men he led back home were rounded up. He was arrested by the agents of the pro-Entente Hungarian leader Mihály Károlyi in Budapest. Mackensen was held in a guarded villa at the edge of Budapest. Later, he was handed over to the representatives of General Louis Franchet d'Espèrey's Allied army. He was a military prisoner in Futog, Serbia, until November 1919. He was one of the 896 Germans on the Allied list of accused war criminals, which was eventually allowed to lapse.

By 1920, Mackensen had retired from the army. Although standing in opposition to the conclusion of the Treaty of Versailles and the newly established parliamentary system of the Weimar Republic, he initially avoided public campaigns. Around 1924, he changed his mind and began to use his image as a war hero to support monarchist and nationalist groups. He routinely appeared in his old Life Hussars uniform. He became very active in pro-military Conservative Revolutionary movement organisations, particularly Der Stahlhelm and the Schlieffen Society, which advocated the stab-in-the-back myth and openly endorsed the murder of Matthias Erzberger in 1921.

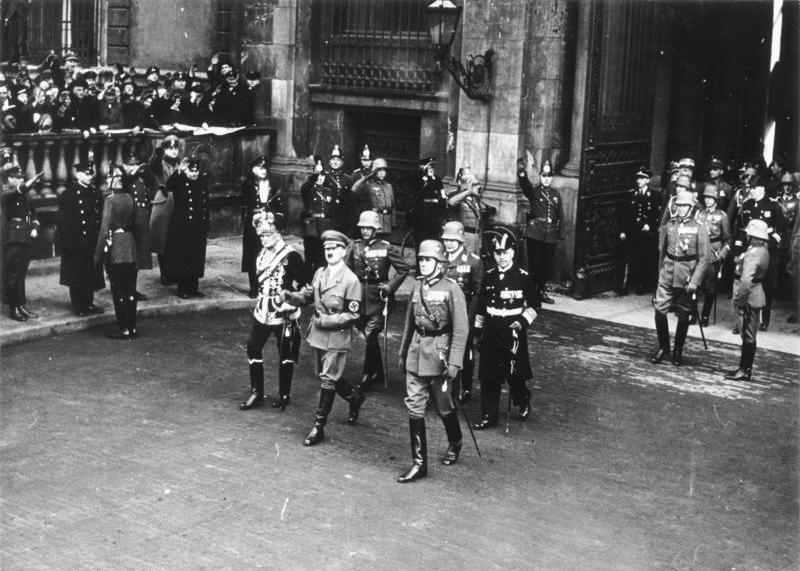
Mackensen and Hitler in 1935 during the Heldengedenktag in Berlin

During the German presidential election of 1932, Mackensen supported Paul von Hindenburg against Adolf Hitler, whose political skills he nevertheless admired.

After Hitler gained power in January 1933, Mackensen became a visible, if largely symbolic, supporter of the Nazi regime. A striking visual icon of the Prussian traditions adopted by Hitler's regime, he appeared in his black uniform and death's-head busby at public events organized by the German government or the Nazi Party such as Potsdam Day on 21 March 1933. On 26 August 1933, Prussian Minister President Hermann Göring appointed Mackensen to the recently reconstituted Prussian State Council. In 1935, he stood by Hitler's side for the ceremonies of the March 16 Heldengedenktag, or Heroes' Memorial Day, celebrating Hitler's public announcement that Germany would cease to comply with the Treaty of Versailles, and would openly re-arm. One of Mackensen's ceremonial visits brought him to Passau, where he received a hero's welcome.

Mackensen was, however, appalled by the murder of his friends General Kurt von Schleicher and General Ferdinand von Bredow in the Night of the Long Knives at the end of June 1934 and said so. He (with others) signed a letter to President Paul von Hindenburg on 18 July detailing the brutal murder of Schleicher and his wife, and noting that Hindenburg's friend Franz von Papen had barely escaped with his life. His letter demanded that Hindenburg punish the responsible parties and create a directorate to rule Germany. He started a campaign to have Schleicher rehabilitated by Hitler and, when this gathered strength and succeeded, spoke about the murders at the annual General Staff Society meeting in February 1935.

Excellency, the gravity of the moment has compelled us to appeal to you as our Supreme Commander. The destiny of our country is at stake. Your Excellency has thrice before saved Germany from foundering, at Tannenberg, at the end of the War and at the moment of your election as Reich President. Excellency, save Germany for the fourth time! The undersigned Generals and senior officers swear to preserve to the last breath their loyalty to you and the Fatherland

closing of the letter to President Hindenburg

Mackensen did not, however, blame Hitler personally but rather some of his more radical subordinates, probably wished Hitler to be retained as chancellor under the suggested directorate, and continued to stand by the regime.

Occasionally mocked as the "Reich Centrepiece", Mackensen's ferocious soldier's visage and distinctive public profile in his black Life Hussars uniform was even recognised by the Hausser-Elastolin company, which produced a 7 cm figure of him in its line of Elastolin composition soldiers. His fame and familiar uniform gave rise to two separate Third Reich units adopting black dress with Totenkopf badges: the Panzerwaffe, which claimed the tradition of the Imperial Cavalry, and the Schutzstaffel (SS). In October 1935, the government vested Mackensen with the demesne of Brüssow in Brandenburg in recognition of his merits.

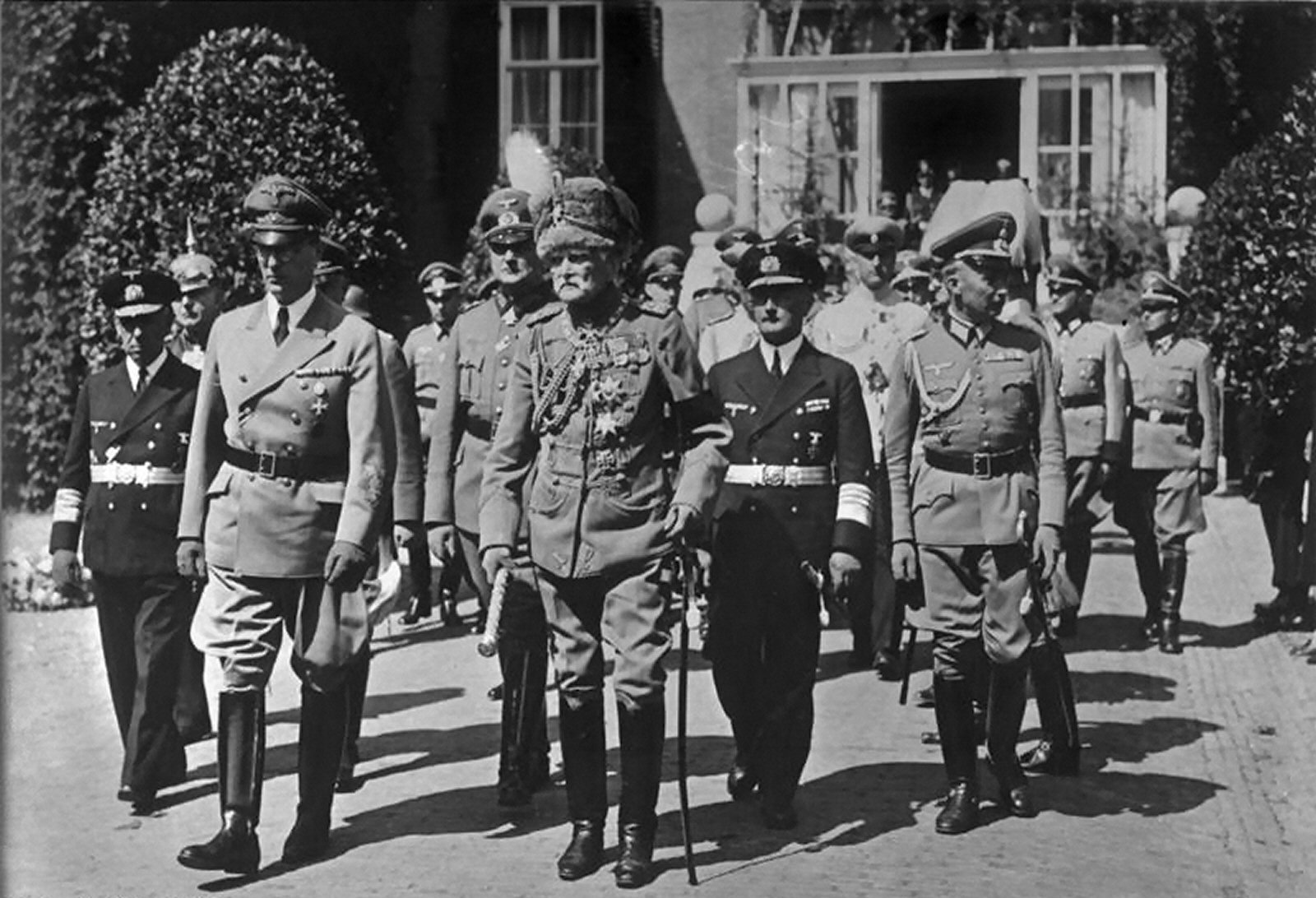
Mackensen at the Kaiser's funeral

In spite of the implicit endorsement provided by his public appearances with high-ranking Nazi officials, Mackensen's relationship to the Nazis was not fully approving: besides the killing of von Bredow and von Schleicher, he also objected to the Nazi Kirchenkampf measures against the Confessing Church and to the atrocities that were committed during the invasion of Poland in September 1939.

On 4 February 1940, Mackensen wrote to then Generaloberst Walther von Brauchitsch:

As a man becomes older, he has to watch carefully that age has not reduced his creativity. After reaching the age of 90, I have decided not to involve myself any longer with matters that are not concerned with my private life. However, I am still the most senior German officer. Many turn to me, sometimes with wishes but more often with their concerns.

During these weeks, our concern is with the spirit of our unique and successful Army. The concern results from the crimes committed in Poland, looting and murder that take place before the eyes of our troops, who appear unable to put an end to them. An apparent indifference has serious consequences for the morale of our soldiers, and it is damaging to the esteem of our Army and our whole nation.

I am sure that you are aware of these events and that you certainly condemn them. These lines intend to convey my daily growing concern at the reports that constantly reach me, and I have to ask you to take up this matter with the highest authority. The messages I receive are so numerous, many come from high ranking persons and from witnesses. As the most senior officer, I cannot keep them to myself. In transmitting them to you, I fulfil my duty to the Army. The honour of the Army and the esteem in which it is held must not be jeopardised by the actions of hired subhumans and criminals. Hail Victory (Sieg Heil).

By the early 1940s, Hitler and Joseph Goebbels suspected Mackensen of disloyalty but refrained from taking action. Mackensen remained a committed monarchist and in June 1941 appeared in full imperial uniform at Kaiser Wilhelm's funeral at Doorn, in the Netherlands.

Hitler personally congratulated Mackensen on his 95th birthday in December 1944 and awarded the 5th cavalry regiment with the armband "Field marshal von Mackensen".

According to a radio news report dated 15 April 1945 that was filed by the CBS News correspondent Larry LeSueur for World News Today, Mackensen was briefly captured by the British Second Army at his home during the closing weeks of the Second World War. Upon the arrival of the British, not commenting on the general rout, the 95-year-old Mackensen merely asked the new powers-that-be that "freed foreign workers" be prevented "from stealing his chickens".

Mackensen died on 8 November 1945 at the age of 95, his life having spanned the Kingdom of Prussia, the North German Confederation, the German Empire, the Weimar Republic, the Nazi regime and the postwar Allied occupation of Germany. He was buried in the Celle cemetery.

== Family ==
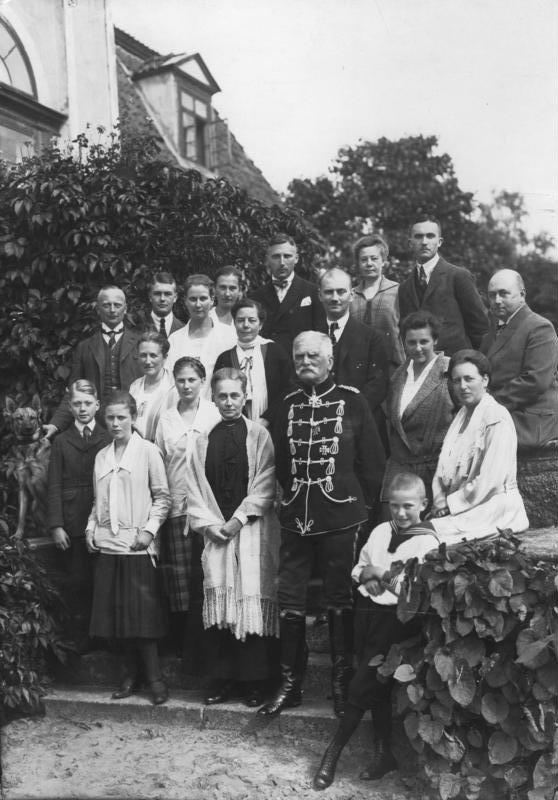
Mackensen's family at his 80th birthday

In November 1879, Mackensen married Dorothea von Horn (1854–1905), and they had five children:

- Else Mackensen (1881/2–1888)
- Hans Georg von Mackensen (1883–1947), diplomat
- Manfred von Mackensen (1886–1947)
- Eberhard von Mackensen (1889–1969), Generaloberst, German Army
- Ruth von Mackensen (1897–1945)

In 1908, after the death of his first wife, Mackensen married Leonie von der Osten (1878–1963).

Mackensen and his family were Lutheran Protestants in the Evangelical Church of Prussia.

== Honours ==
- Kingdom of Prussia:
  - Pour le Mérite (27 November 1914) with Oakleaves (14 June 1915)
  - Grand Cross of the Iron Cross (9 January 1917)
  - Order of the Black Eagle (28 August 1915)
  - Order of the Red Eagle, Grand Cross with Oakleaves with the Royal Crown
  - Order of the Crown, 1st Class
  - Royal House Order of Hohenzollern, Grand Commander with Swords (1915)
  - Iron Cross 2nd Class (1870 version with commemorative oak leaves bearing on them the number 25 in celebration of the 25th anniversary of the German victory in the Franco-Prussian War)
  - Iron Cross 1st Class (1914 version)
  - Officer's Service Decoration Cross for 25 Years' Service
- Grand Duchy of Baden: Order of the Zähringer Lion, Commander 2nd Class with Oakleaves
- Kingdom of Bavaria:
  - Military Order of Max Joseph, Grand Cross (4 June 1915)
  - Military Merit Order, Grand Cross
  - Military Merit Order, Grand Cross with Swords (31 March 1915)
- Duchy of Brunswick: Order of Henry the Lion, Commander 1st Class
- Grand Duchy of Hesse: Order of Philip the Magnanimous, Commander 2nd Class
- Hohenzollern: Princely House Order of Hohenzollern, Cross of Honor 1st Class with Swords (22 November 1916)
- Principality of Lippe: House Order of the Honor Cross, 3rd Class
- Grand Duchy of Mecklenburg-Schwerin:
  - Order of the Griffon, Grand Commander
  - Military Merit Cross, 1st and 2nd Class
- Grand Duchy of Oldenburg: House and Merit Order of Peter Frederick Louis, Grand Cross
- Kingdom of Saxony:
  - Military Order of St. Henry, Commander 1st Class (6 December 1915)
  - Albert Order, Grand Cross with Golden Star
  - Swords to the Albert Order, Grand Cross with Golden Star (15 December 1915)
- Grand Duchy of Saxe-Weimar-Eisenach: Order of the White Falcon
  - Commander's Cross with Star
  - Grand Cross with Swords (1915)
- Saxon Duchies:
  - Ducal Saxe-Ernestine House Order, Grand Cross with Swords (27 January 1915)
  - Carl Eduard War Cross (26 January 1917)
- Principality of Schaumburg-Lippe: House Order of the Honor Cross, 1st Class
- Principality of Waldeck and Pyrmont: Princely Waldeck Merit Cross, 1st Class with Swords (30 March 1915)
- Kingdom of Württemberg:
  - Order of the Württemberg Crown, Grand Cross
  - Swords to the Order of the Württemberg Crown, Grand Cross (1915)
- Austria-Hungary:
  - Military Order of Maria Theresa, Grand Cross (26 March 1918)
  - Order of Leopold, Grand Cross with War Decoration (1914)
  - Order of Franz Joseph, Grand Cross (1900)
  - Order of St. Stephen, Grand Cross (September 1915)
  - Military Merit Cross, 1st Class with War Decoration with Diamonds (6 December 1915)
- Kingdom of Bulgaria:
  - Order of St. Alexander, Grand Cross with Swords and Diamonds
  - Military Order for Bravery, 1st Class
- Ottoman Empire:
  - Order of Osmanieh, 2nd Class
  - Order of Osmanieh, 1st Class
  - Order of the Medjidie, 1st Class
- Russian Empire:
  - Order of Saint Anna, 1st Class
  - Order of St. Stanislaus, 1st Class

The University of Halle-Wittenberg appointed him to Honorary Doctor of Political Sciences and the Danzig University of Technology granted him the title Doktoringenieur.

The Mackensen-class battlecruiser, named after Mackensen, was the last class of battlecruisers to be built by Germany in the First World War, the lead ship, SMS Mackensen, was launched on 21 April 1917.

Mackensen was an Honorary Citizen of many cities, such as Danzig, Heilsberg, Buetow, and Tarnovo. In 1915, the newly built rural village of Mackensen in Pomerania was named after him. In various cities, streets were named after him. In 1998 the Mackensenstraße in the Schöneberg district of Berlin was renamed Else-Lasker-Schüler-Straße, based on a claim that Mackensen was one of the "pioneers of National Socialism".

== Notes ==
Military offices
Preceded by General der Infanterie Georg von Braunschweig	Commander, XVII Corps; 27 January 1908 – 1 November 1914	Succeeded by General der Infanterie Günther von Pannewitz
Preceded by Generaloberst Paul von Hindenburg	Commander, 9th Army; 2 November 1914 – 17 April 1915	Succeeded by General der Kavallerie Prince Leopold of Bavaria
Preceded by General der Infanterie Max von Fabeck	Commander, 11th Army; 16 April 1915 – 8 September 1915	Succeeded by General der Artillerie Max von Gallwitz
Preceded by New Formation	Commander, Army Group Mackensen (Poland); 22 April – 8 September 1915	Succeeded by Dissolved
Preceded by New Formation	Commander, Army Group Mackensen (Serbia); 9 September 1915 – 30 July 1916	Succeeded by Otto von Below
Preceded by New Formation	Commander, Army Group Mackensen (Romania); 28 August 1916 – 7 May 1918	Succeeded by Dissolved
