= Karl-Günther Heimsoth =

German physician, polygraph and politician

Karl-Günther Heimsoth, also known as Karl-Guenter Heimsoth (4 December 1899 – 1934), was a German physician, polygraph, and politician. Heimsoth was a member of the Nazi Party and later the Communist Party of Germany.

== Life and work ==
=== Early life and studies (1919 to 1924) ===
Karl-Günther Heimsoth was born in Charlottenburg, the son of a court clerk and bank director. His youth was spent in Dortmund, where in June 1917 he passed his abitur, a test of maturity which was simplified temporarily because of the First World War. He then enlisted in the Prussian Army and until the end of 1918 participated in World War I, being deployed on the Western Front - finishing with the rank of lieutenant.

In the summer semester of 1919, Heimsoth began studying medicine at the University of Tübingen. Heimsoth continued his clinical training at the Ludwig-Maximilians-Universität München, Kiel University, and the University of Rostock. At the University of Rostock, he passed his state examination to practice medicine in the spring of 1924. During his studies, in 1920 and 1921 he participated in the Ruhr Uprising, the fights in Thuringia, and the Silesian Uprisings as a member of the Freikorps.

Between August and November 1924 Heimsoth wrote at Rostock his dissertation entitled Hetero- und Homophilie ("Hetero- and Homophilia"), which was devoted to homosexuality. With this work, Heimsoth was probably the first to introduce the term "homophilia" in sexology.

The thesis argued that in certain erotic and friendly relationships there are certain norms looked for and desired which are "the same". This homophilia can occur both in relationships between men and between women. In contrast, Heimsoth saw heterophilia as a relationship characterized by "the opposite"; considered well within the range of heterophilia are platonic relationships between an effeminate man and a masculine man. His interpretations of homosexuality and male friendship were based upon previous ideas, as developed in 1903 by Otto Weininger in Geschlecht und Charakter ("Sex and Character") and in 1919 by Hans Blüher in Die Rolle der Erotik in der männlichen Gesellschaft ("The Role of Eroticism in Male Society"). Heimsoth's reflections start with Blüher's theory on the central meaning of eroticism between men to society.

From Weininger, Heimsoth took the "law of the polar union" as an impulse of the sexual union and completed it with a second "law of the homopolar union". He basically tried to prove that a masculine man could want another masculine man, because there were esoteric and friendly connections in such a relationship which were not wanted nor looked for in the other sex, but rather in the same sex, as an opposite pole. His hypothesis was one of the first to question heteronormative assumptions and stereotypes, which seek to explain homosexuality as nothing more than a reflection of the heterosexual dynamic that looks for opposite characteristics. As such, it was pioneering in its approach to homosexuality as a sexual attraction that seeks out what is similar or identical, without any reference to the heterosexual polarity or proxies for the same in the form of 'third genders'. Male homosexuality would thus be defined by the attraction of the masculine to the masculine without any reference to the feminine or to the polarity of the male female difference, thereby liberating the sexual orientation and attraction between homosexual males from electromagnetic analogies and other such heteronormative paradigms that try to explain all sexual attraction as being a function of polar opposites. Heimsoth's 1924 dissertation represents thus an emancipated conceptualization of same-sex attraction that is divorced from the heterosexual and from the conceptualization of homosexuality as an 'inbetween' state between the feminine and masculine.

=== Activist and writer in the Weimar Republic (1924 to 1928) ===
After obtaining his doctorate, Heimsoth worked at practices in the Gynecologic University Clinic of Kiel. At the same time, he became an "activist of the first homosexual emancipation movement", but distanced himself from the Scientific-Humanitarian Committee that had formed around Magnus Hirschfeld, because he considered that the theories advocated by the Committee concerning the "third sex" were wrong, and based on a reflex or proxy for the heteronormative assumption that sexual attraction is possible only as a function of polar opposites, even when such polar opposites are embodied within one individual as in the 'third sex'. Theories regarding the 'third sex' from which he chose to distance himself, are ultimately based on the idea that the polarity represented by heterosexuality must be universal, and as such even homosexual individuals and the homosexual orientation itself must reproduce or emulate that polarity. Heimsoth's theory on the other hand does not rely on heterosexuality to explain homosexuality. Instead it takes homosexuality as it is, as an attraction to the same sex, without any reference to a polarity real or imagined. In his writing Freundesliebe oder Homosexualität ("Love Between Friends or Homosexuality"), published in the magazine Der Eigene by Adolf Brand in 1925, Heimsoth showed his antisemitism: "All heroic and masculine love between friends" remains, "in his idea and possibilities of understanding[,] foreign to the Jewish spirit". Male homosexuality is thus envisioned as not only heroic, but purely masculine, not only in terms of its object of attraction but also in the sexual identity and being of the man in question. In this understanding it is the masculine within the homosexual male that seeks out the same masculinity in other males as sexually attractive without any reference to an assumed internal feminine. Heimsoth's ideal was that of a whole man, virile and Aryan. Homoerotic friendships between men were to serve as a nexus of "obersten Machtaufgebot" (called higher power). Heimsoth thought that he could find examples of such heroes among the soldiers of World War I and among the Freikorps environment, as can be gathered from his 1925 publication in the magazine Der Eigene: in it he asked to be sent documentation to demonstrate the "circumstances and homoerotic relations in the Kampfwagen formations and secret societies" and wanted to obtain material "about heroism, the heroic leader problem and the psyche of the volunteers, the desperate, Landsknechte, Freikorps members, and secret societies".

From 1925 to 1928 Heimsoth learned astrology from the frigate captain Friedrich Schwickert in Vienna. Heimsoth's publication Charakter-Konstellation: Mit besonderer Berücksichtigung der Gleichgeschlechtlichkeit (1929; "Character Constellation: With Particular Reference to Homosexuality") is dedicated to Schwickert. This work attempts to unite psychology and astrology and create a framework for determining the degree of homosexuality of a person based upon the constellation of stars at the time of his birth.

=== Relationship with Röhm (1928 to 1934) ===
In 1928, Heimsoth wrote a letter to Ernst Röhm. Röhm, convicted of treason following his participation in the Munich Beer Hall Putsch, had quarreled with Hitler. Excerpts from Röhm's book Geschichte eines Hochverräters, published in 1928, were read "between the lines" by Heimsoth as recognition of the author's homosexuality. At that time a reform of Paragraph 175 was being discussed in the Reichstag, in which the Nazi Party demanded a sharper persecution of homosexuals, and apparently Heimsoth wanted to convince Röhm, a known Nazi, to position himself clearly against §175. Röhm confirmed Heimsoth's assumptions:

I fully understand! Of course I struggle with the paragraph on morale, especially with §175. But do you mean that I do not make it clear enough? In the first draft I had introduced a more detailed explanation on the subject, but I modified it to its present form after hearing the advice of friends, who believe that this kind of writing is more effective.

— Röhm's Letter to Heimsoth of 3 December 1928

Röhm and Heimsoth met in person in 1928. In subsequent letters from Röhm, it can be deduced that they had conversations about very personal issues and were together at gay meeting places in Berlin. Heimsoth subsequently deposited Röhm's letters in the safe of a lawyer. In 1930 Röhm became head of the SA. From April 1930, Munich prosecutors investigated Röhm for "unnatural fornication". On 10 July 1931 the Berlin Police requisitioned Röhm's letters in a search of his house; Heimsoth was interrogated. Towards late 1931 and early 1932, the State Secretary of the Interior of Prussia, Wilhelm Abegg, informed the social democrat journalist Helmuth Klotz of the existence of the letters. Along with an extensive press report, Klotz published the letters in March 1932.

At the time of the correspondence with Röhm, it appears that Heimsoth became a member of the NSDAP. According to Otto Strasser, Heimsoth was not only an active member of the Nazi Party in the following years, but a "flaming National Socialist".

=== Departure from the Nazi Party ===
In 1930 Heimsoth joined the Kampfgemeinschaft Revolutionärer Nationalsozialisten (KGRNS), a group led by Strasser who had left the NSDAP, and that same year he went on to take the "Office for the Study of Foreign Policy", besides becoming a member of the Reichsführerrat ("Council of Leaders of the Reich") of the KGRNS. Between Strasser, who belonged to the "left" wing of the NSDAP, and Hitler there had previously been differences in the policy pursued by the latter in matters of legality. In June 1931 Strasser warned the police about the existence of Röhm's letters. Heimsoth dropped out of the KGRNS in August 1931; in September he called the KGRNS a "fascist government reserve" and told them that his decision was not the result of a political discussion, but was for personal reasons.

Heimsoth joined the Communist Party of Germany (KPD), joining a nationalist faction led by Beppo Römer. Heimsoth was a member of the Executive Committee (Leiko) of the Aufbruch-Arbeitskreise (AAK) focused around the magazine Aufbruch published by Römer. The AAK was an attempt by the KPD to win over circles of intellectuals and military officers as allies in their fight against Nazism. Heimsoth was also an informer of the political-military apparatus of the KPD, part of the party's secret service under the command of Hans Kippenberger.

=== Disappearance and death (1934) ===
After the Machtergreifung, Heimsoth continued to provide information to the Communist Party (KPD) secret service despite having formally joined the Nazis (NSDAP). A September 1933 Gestapo report also recorded his continued contacts with Beppo Römer.

According to a petition for assistance that Heimsoth’s mother addressed to the Commander-in-Chief of the Army Werner von Fritsch on 13 September 1934, Heimsoth was taken into protective custody (Schutzhaft) on 3 March 1934 for “political activities” and transferred to Breslau. He was reportedly brought back to Berlin on 15 March 1934 and released on 16 March 1934. His mother stated that no trace of him was found thereafter.

In a letter dated 27 May 1950, a Dr. Bruno Krause informed the Munich public prosecutor’s office that, based on further inquiries he had conducted in 1934 on behalf of Heimsoth’s mother, Heimsoth had been arrested by the Breslau SA-Obergruppenführer and police president Edmund Heines and shot in Breslau. Krause further reported that a senior judge at the Breslau Higher Regional Court had told him at the time that Heimsoth’s shooting there was an open secret.

In the central membership file of the NSDAP, Heimsoth was noted in July 1934 as having “resigned” due to death, based on a report from the Berlin Gau.

This entry later led to assumptions in some literature that he had been killed during the purge of 30 June–1 July 1934 known as the Night of the Long Knives.

Ernst Jünger later commented on what he believed to have been Heimsoth’s murder, writing that Heimsoth “kept a dubious practice in the Wittenbergplatz, a real pitfall. Just like the clairvoyant Hanussen, he was full of dangerous secrets and was one of the first to be killed.”

The writer Hanns Heinz Ewers used information from Heimsoth in his 1931 novel Reiter in deutscher Nacht ("Knights of the German Night"), about the Freikorps. The character of homosexual lieutenant Detlev Hinrichsen is a tribute to Heimsoth.

== Writings ==
- Hetero- und Homophilie. Eine neuorientierende An- und Einordnung der Erscheinungsbilder, der "Homosexualität" und der "Inversion" in Berücksichtigung der sogenannten "normalen Freundschaft" auf Grund der zwei verschiedenen erotischen Anziehungsgesetze und der bisexuellen Grundeinstellung des Mannes, Dortmund 1924. (Dissertation)
- Charakter-Konstellation. Mit besonderer Berücksichtigung der Gleichgeschlechtlichkeit, Munich 1928.
- Freikorps greift an! Militärpolitische Geschichte und Kritik der Angriffs-Unternehmen in Oberschlesien 1921, Berlin 1930.

== Bibliography ==
- Bruns, Claudia; zur Nieden, Susanne (2006). "'Und unsere germanische Art beruht bekanntlich zentnerschwer auf unserem Triebleben...'. Der arische Körper als Schauplatz von Deutungskämpfen bei Blüher, Heimsoth und Röhm". In Diehl, Paula (ed.). Verkörperung – Entkörperung. Körperbilder und Körperpraxen im Nationalsozialismus (in German). Munich: Fink. pp. 111–28. ISBN 3-7705-4256-8.
- Hergemöller, Bernd-Ulrich (1998). Mann für Mann. Biographisches Lexikon zur Geschichte von Freundesliebe und mannmännlicher Sexualität im deutschen Sprachraum [Man for Man: A Biographical Lexicon on the History of Friendship and Male Sexuality in German-Speaking Countries] (in German). Hamburg: MännerschwarmSkript Verlag. ISBN 3-928983-65-2.
- Jellonnek, Burkhard (1990). Homosexuelle unter dem Hakenkreuz. Die Verfolgung von Homosexuellen im Dritten Reich (in German). Paderborn: Schöningh. ISBN 3-506-77482-4.
- Kaufmann, Bernhard; Reisener, Eckhard; Schwips, Dieter; Walther, Henri (1993). Der Nachrichtendienst der KPD 1919−1937 (in German). Berlin: Dietz Verlag. ISBN 3-320-01817-5.
- Moreau, Patrick (1985). Nationalsozialismus von links. Die 'Kampfgemeinschaft Revolutionärer Nationalsozialisten' und die 'Schwarze Front' Otto Straßers 1930-1935 (in German). Stuttgart: Deutsche Verlags-Anstalt. ISBN 3-421-06192-0.
- zur Nieden, Susanne (2004). "Die 'männerheldische heroische Freundesliebe' bleibt 'dem Judengeiste fremd'. Antisemitismus und Maskulinismus" (PDF). In Kotowsky, E.V.; Schoeps, J.H. (eds.). Der Sexualreformer Magnus Hirschfeld (1868–1935): Ein Leben im Spannungsfeld von Wissenschaft, Politik und Geschichte (in German). pp. 329–42. Archived from the original (PDF) on 30 December 2013.
- zur Nieden, Susanne (2005). "Aufstieg und Fall des virilen Männerhelden. Der Skandal um Ernst Röhm und seine Ermordung". In zur Nieden, Susanne (ed.). Homosexualität und Staatsräson. Männlichkeit, Homophobie und Politik in Deutschland 1900−1945 (in German). Frankfurt am Main: Campus Verlag. pp. 147−92. ISBN 3-593-37749-7.
