= Mylius =

Mylius is a surname. Notable people with the surname include:

- Edward Mylius (1878–1947), Belgian-born journalist jailed in England in 1911 for libel against King George V
- Helmut Mylius (1891–1973), German industrialist
- Johan Caspar Mylius (1776–1852), Danish military officer and landowner
- Johann Daniel Mylius (c. 1583 – 1642), German composer for the lute, and writer on alchemy
- Jørgen de Mylius (born 1946), Danish radio and TV personality
- Klaus Mylius (1930–2025), German indologist
- Ludvig Mylius-Erichsen (1872–1907), Danish author, ethnologist, and explorer
- Mario Mylius (1912–1980), Swiss equestrian

== Other uses ==
- Mylius, a son of Priam, King of Troy
- Mylius, the corporate font of British Airways
- Mylius Aircraft, a manufacturer of airplanes
- Mylius Prize, an Italian prize for painting awarded 1841–1939
- Mylius–Eaton House, a historic building in Sioux City, Iowa, United States
- Mylius-Erichsen Land, a peninsula in northeastern Greenland
