= Operation Spark =

Operation Spark may refer to:

- Operation Spark (1940), was a British diversionary naval operation in World War II
- Operation Spark (1941), an attempt by officers in the German Wehrmacht to dispose of Adolf Hitler
- Operation Spark (1943), a military operation conducted by the Red Army in 1943 to lift the Siege of Leningrad
- Operation Spark (1973), an operation designed to cover the Syrian and Egyptian military build-up in preparation for Operation Badr
