= Rudolf-Christoph von Gersdorff =

German general and failed assassin of Adolf Hitler (1905–1980)

Rudolf-Christoph Freiherr von Gersdorff
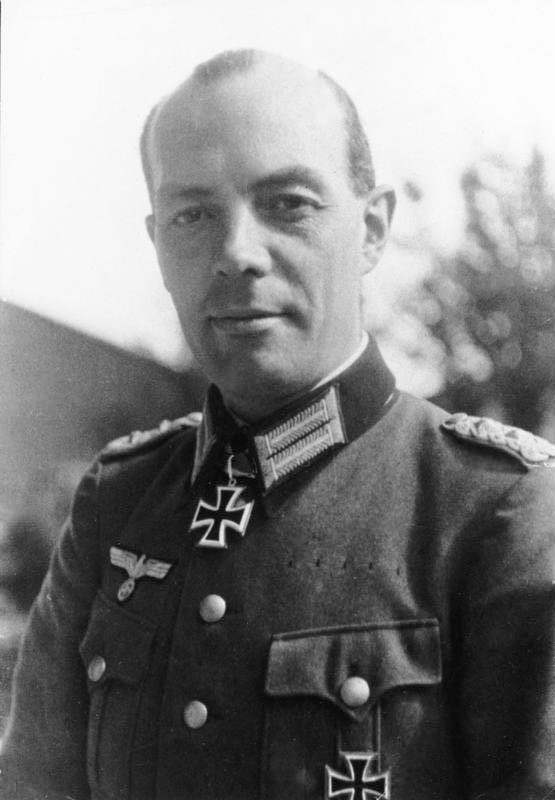
- Born: 27 March 1905; Lüben, Silesia, German Empire
- Died: 27 January 1980 (aged 74); Munich, West Germany
- Burial place: Ostfriedhof (Munich)
- Military career
- Allegiance: Weimar Republic; Nazi Germany
- Branch: Reichswehr; Wehrmacht
- Service years: 1923–1945
- Rank: Generalmajor
- Units: Abwehr; Army Group Center
- Conflicts: World War II; Invasion of Poland (1939); Battle of France; Operation Barbarossa; Eastern Front; Battle of Normandy; Falaise pocket
- Awards: Knight's Cross of the Iron Cross; Großes Verdienstkreuz (Great Cross of Merit)
- Other work: Order of St. John, Johanniter-Unfall-Hilfe (1952–63 chairman)

Rudolf-Christoph Freiherr von Gersdorff (27 March 1905 – 27 January 1980) was an officer in the German Army. As a Wehrmacht intelligence officer, he attempted to assassinate Adolf Hitler by suicide bombing on 21 March 1943; the plan failed when Hitler left early, but Gersdorff was undetected. That same month, soldiers from his unit discovered the mass graves of the Soviet-perpetrated Katyn massacre.

== Early years ==
Rudolf-Christoph von Gersdorff was born into a military family of Silesian nobility. He was the second son of Baron Ernst von Gersdorff and his spouse Christine (née Countess zu Dohna-Schlodien). In 1934, Gersdorff married Renata Kracker von Schwartzenfeldt (1913–1942), co-heiress to the rich Silesian industrialist family von Kramsta, with whom he had one daughter, Eleonore. Gersdorff later married Eva-Maria von Waldenburg, who was a direct descendant of Prince Augustus of Prussia, although through an illegitimate line. She was previously married to Kurt von Wallenberg-Pachaly. His third and final marriage was to Irmgard Löwe. Rudolf-Christoph joined the Reichswehr as an officer cadet in 1923. He received his initial military education in Breslau.

== Military career ==
In 1926, Gersdorff was promoted to second lieutenant, and in 1934 to Rittmeister (cavalry captain). The following day he graduated from the Prussian Military Academy in Berlin. In 1939, Gersdorff's unit was deployed in the German invasion of Poland, and he subsequently served as a general staff officer in the Battle of France.

In 1941, for Operation Barbarossa, he was transferred to Army Group Center, where he served as intelligence liaison with the Abwehr (German military intelligence). Tresckow, Gersdorff and their circle of conspirators within the Army Group Center were well informed about the war crimes against Soviet POWs and the mass murder of Jews by Einsatzgruppe B, and provided required military cooperation. As an intelligence staff officer (Ic), Gersdorff was responsible for contact with the Einsatzgruppe staff.

In April 1943, while still an Army Group Center intelligence staff officer, Gersdorff supervised the excavation of the mass graves of the Katyn massacre, which contained the remains of over 4,000 Polish officers shot by the Soviet NKVD in 1940. In 1944, Gersdorff was transferred to the Atlantic Wall. Later that year he was decorated with the Knight's Cross of the Iron Cross for his staff work in preparation for the German breakout from the Falaise pocket.

== Conspiracy to assassinate Hitler ==
After becoming close friends with leading Army Group Center conspirator Colonel (later Major General) Henning von Tresckow, Gersdorff agreed to join the conspiracy to kill Adolf Hitler. After Tresckow's elaborate plan to assassinate Hitler on 13 March 1943 failed, Gersdorff declared himself ready to give his life for Germany's sake in an assassination attempt.

On 21 March 1943, Hitler visited the Zeughaus Berlin, the old armory on Unter den Linden, to inspect captured Soviet weapons. This was as part of the Heldengedenktag public holiday on which the Nazis propagandized hero worship of the military dead. Originally it was Volkstrauertag, grieving for the dead of World War I. A group of top Nazi and leading military officials—among them Hermann Göring, Heinrich Himmler, Field Marshal Wilhelm Keitel, and Grand Admiral Karl Dönitz—were present as well. As an expert, Gersdorff was to guide Hitler on a tour of the exhibition. Moments after Hitler entered the museum, Gersdorff set off two ten-minute delayed fuses on explosive devices hidden in his coat pockets. His plan was to throw himself around Hitler in a death embrace that would blow them both up. A detailed plan for a coup d'état had been worked out and was ready to go; but, contrary to expectations, Hitler raced through the museum in less than ten minutes. After he had left the building, Gersdorff was able to defuse the devices in a public bathroom "at the last second." After the attempt, he was immediately transferred back to the Eastern Front where he managed to evade suspicion.

Prior to the 20 July plot, Gersdorff had also hidden the explosives and fuses that another conspirator, Wessel Freytag von Loringhoven, managed to procure from a cache of captured British weapons and which Claus Schenk Graf von Stauffenberg was to use in his attempt to kill Hitler. Because of the silence of his imprisoned and tortured co-conspirators, Gersdorff was able to escape arrest and certain execution. As a result, he was one of the few German military resistors to survive the war (others included Axel Freiherr von dem Bussche-Streithorst and Eberhard von Breitenbuch).

== Later years ==
Following the war, Gersdorff participated in the work of the U.S. Army Historical Division, in which, under the guidance of Franz Halder, German generals wrote World War II operational studies for the U.S. Army, first as POWs and then as employees. In the late 1940s, Gersdorff authored an operational study on the Wehrmacht response to the Allied Normandy breakout. (The study, together with contributions from Paul Hausser, Heinrich Freiherr von Lüttwitz, Wilhelm Fahrmbacher and Heinrich Eberbach, was published in 2004 as Fighting the Breakout: The German Army in Normandy from COBRA to the Falaise Gap).

In the mid-1950s, Gersdorff tried to join the Bundeswehr, the armed forces of postwar West Germany. Despite his distinguished record and decorations, his attempts were, according to Gersdorff, opposed by Hans Globke, the powerful head of the German Chancellery and confidant of Chancellor Konrad Adenauer, and by various former Wehrmacht officers in the Bundeswehr who did not want a "traitor" in their midst. He thus was prevented from resuming his military career.

Gersdorff later dedicated his life to charity in the Order of St. John. He was a founding president of the Johanniter-Unfall-Hilfe, which he chaired from 1952 to 1963. In 1979 he was awarded the Großes Verdienstkreuz (Grand Cross of Merit), one of the eight classes of West Germany's only state decoration, in recognition of his accomplishments. A riding accident in 1967 left Gersdorff paraplegic for the last twelve years of his life, during which he wrote and published his memoirs, German: Soldat im Untergang, lit. 'Soldier During the Downfall'. Gersdorff died in Munich, Bavaria, in 1980, at the age of 74.

== Assessment ==
In his memoirs, Gersdorff claimed to have opposed the OKW's Commissar Order and other "criminal orders". This was shown to be false by the historian Johannes Hürter, of the Munich Institute for Contemporary History. Hürter also found that "Tresckow and his circle were by no means fundamentally opposed to Hitler's decision to attack the Soviet Union, and that they were well informed of and collaborative in the earliest mass murders of Jewish civilians", as many officers in the Army Group Center were aligned with National Socialist Ideology with its anti-communism and anti-Semitism.

Hürter states that many of the officers of that group of conspirators in particular, believed that these crimes against humanity still in the initial stages would appear "less horrific when weighed against the chance to strike at the heart of the Soviet Union and only when it became apparent that the military risk had not paid off and the mass murders took on genocidal dimension did ethical second thoughts come to play a role for the young staff officers of the Army Group Center". The memoirs were influential in shaping the post-war discourse on the German military resistance and included many of the "myth-building statements" that fed much later works on the subject.

== Works ==
- Soldat im Untergang ("Soldier During the Downfall") (1982). Ullstein Taschenbuchverlag. ISBN 3-548-34008-3 (ISBN ), ISBN 978-3-548-34008-1 (in German)
- Fighting the Breakout: The German Army in Normandy from COBRA to the Falaise Gap (contributor) (2004). Mechanicsburg, PA: Stackpole Books. ISBN 978-1-85367-584-3

== See also ==
- German Resistance
- Assassination attempts on Adolf Hitler
