= Operation Spark (1941) =

German conspiracy to assassinate Hitler

Operation Spark (sometimes translated as "Operation Flash") was the code name for the planned assassination of Nazi dictator Adolf Hitler by the anti-Nazi conspiracy of German Army officers and political conservatives, known as the Schwarze Kapelle ("black orchestra") during World War II. The name was coined by Major General Henning von Tresckow in 1941. He believed that because of Hitler's many successes up to that time, his personal charisma, and the oath of personal loyalty to him sworn by all German army officers, it would be impossible to overthrow Hitler and the Nazis with Hitler still alive. Hitler's death, however, would be a "spark"—a signal that it was time to launch an internal coup d'état to overthrow the Nazi regime and end the war.

By early 1943, the failure to overcome the Soviet Union, including the disastrous defeat at Stalingrad, defeats in North Africa, and increasing Allied bombing of Germany had substantially weakened many Germans' allegiance to the Nazi regime. The conspirators decided it was time for the "spark". General Friedrich Olbricht, who controlled the Ersatzheer (Replacement Army) set up a plan for Replacement Army troops to seize control of Germany after Hitler was killed. Tresckow was now serving as Chief Operations Officer of Army Group Centre (AGC) on the Eastern Front. AGC commander Günther von Kluge knew of Tresckow's activities, but did not denounce him to the Gestapo, nor participate himself. He allowed Tresckow to put several other anti-Nazi officers on the AGC staff, but he also tried to dissuade Tresckow from taking action.

== Major collaborators ==
- Major General Henning von Tresckow, Chief Operations Officer of AGC
- Lieutenant Fabian von Schlabrendorff, Tresckow's Special Operations Officer at AGC
- Colonel Rudolph-Christoph von Gersdorff, Tresckow's Abwehr Intelligence Liaison Officer
- Major Georg von Boeselager, commander of cavalry forces near AGC headquarters
- Captain Axel Freiherr von dem Bussche-Streithorst
- Captain Eberhard von Breitenbuch
- Lieutenant Colonel Werner Schrader
- General Friedrich Olbricht, Chief of the Armed Forces Replacement Office (Wehrersatzamt)

== Attempts at Army Group Centre ==
Hitler flew to Werwolf, his "field headquarters" near Vinnitsa in Ukraine, on 19 February 1943, staying until 13 March. He decided that before returning to Germany, he would also visit AGC headquarters near Smolensk that same day. He would meet with Kluge, and dine in the officers' mess before departing. This was the first opportunity for his assassination by Tresckow's group.

For such an occasion, Tresckow had prepared three options:

- Major von Boeselager had formed a cavalry "honour guard" unit secretly packed with anti-Nazi officers. With this force he could intercept Hitler in the forest between the airfield and the HQ area, overwhelm Hitler's SS escort in a fair fight, and kill the Führer. This option was rejected because even the plotters disliked the prospect of German soldiers fighting each other, and because the attack could fail if the escort was stronger than expected.
- The plotters could shoot Hitler during dinner in the mess. This option was also abandoned for many of the plotters abhorred the idea of shooting an unarmed man and would not go along.
- A timebomb could be smuggled on Hitler's plane. This was the plan ultimately attempted.

The bomb was adapted from a British plastic explosive, which had been seized by the Abwehr from captured SOE agents. The pencil detonator consisted of a thin copper tube containing copper chloride that would take about ten minutes to silently eat through wire holding back the spring-loaded firing pin from the percussion cap. This mechanism provided a time delay for detonation, without any telltale ticking of a clockwork mechanism or smell from a burning fuse.

The bomb was disguised as a box supposedly containing two bottles of Cointreau. Tresckow was acquainted with Lieutenant Colonel Heinz Brandt, an officer on Hitler's staff, who traveled on Hitler's plane. Tresckow asked Brandt to take the parcel with him to Germany for delivery to Tresckow's friend General Helmuth Stieff. (Stieff was anti-Nazi, but not then part of the fiasco.) Tresckow claimed the liquor was the payoff for a bet he had lost to Stieff.

Tresckow's aide, Schlabrendorff, carried the parcel to the airfield. As Hitler and his entourage prepared to board his plane, Schlabrendorff secretly activated the detonator with a pair of pliers, then re-closed the parcel and handed it to Brandt as he boarded the plane.

The bomb was expected to explode about half an hour later, with the plane near Minsk, close enough to the front for the plane's loss to be attributed to Soviet fighters.

When the crash and Hitler's death were reported, General Olbricht would use the Replacement Army to seize control in Berlin, Vienna, and Munich, and in the centres of the Wehrkreis (the German military supply system). It was an ambitious but credible plan, and might possibly have worked if Hitler had indeed been killed, although persuading Army units to fight and overcome possible fierce resistance from the SS could have been a major obstacle.

However, as with Elser's bomb in 1939 and all other attempts, luck favoured Hitler, which he attributed to Vorsehung ("Providence"). The British-made detonator had been tested many times and was considered reliable. It operated correctly, but the bomb did not explode. The percussion cap apparently became too cold as the parcel was carried in the unheated cargo hold.

Displaying great composure, Schlabrendorff took the next plane to retrieve the package from Lt. Colonel Brandt before the bomb was discovered or eventually detonated late. The explosives were later used by Gersdorff and Claus Von Stauffenberg.

== Later attempts ==
=== Suicide bomb at museum ===
Army Group Center provided a collection of captured Soviet Army weapons to be displayed at a military museum in Berlin. The display was to open on 21 March 1943, with a personal viewing by Hitler, Luftwaffe commander Hermann Göring, Reichsführer-SS Heinrich Himmler, Kriegsmarine commander Karl Dönitz, and OKW chief Wilhelm Keitel.

Colonel Gersdorff volunteered to be a human time bomb. He would carry the explosives inside his army coat. The museum was unheated, so his wearing a long coat would not seem suspicious. A few minutes before Hitler arrived, he would start the ten-minute fuses on the explosives. Just before the bombs would go off, he would rush to Hitler and embrace him; the explosion would kill both men.

Despite the plan, at the last minute just before Hitler was to appear, his visit was reduced to just eight minutes as a security precaution, and he breezed through in just two minutes, leaving well before Gersdorff's explosives would have gone off. Gersdorff barely managed to get out and defuse the bombs.

=== The winter uniform suicide bomb ===
Standard German army uniforms had proven inadequate for the harsh conditions of the Russian winter, thus the Army had a new winter uniform designed. A viewing of the new uniform by Hitler was arranged. The uniform was also to be adopted by the Waffen-SS and the Luftwaffe Field Divisions, so SS chief Heinrich Himmler and Luftwaffe commander Hermann Göring were expected to be present as well. This made for a great opportunity: the three most important and powerful Nazis could all be finished.

After several misfires (due to a rescheduling made by one of the three men), the viewing was scheduled for 16 November 1943.

The model was to be Axel von dem Bussche, who volunteered to carry a landmine in the knapsack of the uniform, and detonate it when the three Nazi leaders were gathered around him. Nonetheless, the freight car containing the new uniforms was destroyed in an Allied air raid the night before the scheduled demonstration. The viewing was rescheduled, but again delayed by schedule conflicts among the "Big Three" Nazis until February. Meanwhile, von dem Bussche had to return to front-line duty, and was badly wounded, losing part of one leg, so he could no longer serve as model.

Captain Ewald von Kleist volunteered to replace von dem Bussche, and attempt a similar suicide bombing at a viewing scheduled for 11 February 1944; yet this event was repeatedly postponed and eventually cancelled.

=== Shooting attack ===
Captain Eberhard von Breitenbuch was on the staff of Field Marshal Ernst Busch, now commanding Army Group Centre. In early 1944, Busch and his staff were summoned to brief Hitler. Breitenbuch volunteered to carry a 7.65mm Browning pistol concealed in his trouser pocket into the briefing (which took place on 11 March), and shoot Hitler. But on the day of the briefing, Hitler issued a Führer directive excluding junior officers from Führer briefings.

=== Water tower bomb ===
Two army conspirators smuggled a bomb into the Wolf's Lair and lowered it into a water tower. But the bomb mysteriously exploded a few weeks later, jolting the SS guards. SS Chief Himmler immediately launched an inquiry into the incident which was deliberately blocked by Lieutenant Colonel Werner Schrader–the investigative officer in charge and, as it turned out, a fellow conspirator.
