= German Social Union (West Germany) =

1956–1962 far-right political party in West Germany

German Social Union Deutsch-Soziale Union
- President: Otto Strasser
- Founded: 17 June 1956; 70 years ago
- Dissolved: 25 May 1962; 64 years ago
- Preceded by: Black Front (KGRNS) (Note: Not a legal predecessor)
- Succeeded by: De facto: (Note: Not legal successors); Jan 1962: Independent Workers' Party; May 1962: German Freedom Party
- Headquarters: Munich, FGR
- Newspaper: Die Deutsche Revolution
- Membership (1962): 1,000
- Ideology: Strasserism
- Political position: Far-right
- Colours: Black

The German Social Union (German: Deutsch-Soziale Union, DSU) was a small nationalist political party founded in West Germany in 1956 by Otto Strasser, a dissident former Nazi and the founder of the Black Front. The party sought to revive Strasser's unique brand of "German socialism"—a fusion of nationalism and anti-capitalism, distinct from Adolf Hitler's ideology. The DSU failed to gain mass support and dissolved in 1962.

== Background ==
Otto Strasser had been expelled from the Nazi Party in 1930 for opposing Hitler's leadership and alignment with capitalist elites. He subsequently formed the Black Front, advocating a more radical and worker-oriented version of Nazism. After fleeing Germany in 1933, Strasser spent years in exile, mostly in Canada, before returning to West Germany in 1955.

=== Free-Germany Movement ===
The Free-Germany Movement was founded on January 30, 1941 (the 8th anniversary of Hitler's take-over of power in Germany), in part as a continuation of emigre remnants of Strasser's Black Front group. Strasser modelled his organization on the 'Free France' of Charles de Gaulle. The group began publishing propaganda material in German, English and Spanish languages. In its first proclamation the Free-Germany Movement called for "struggle against Nazism and punishment of the guilty" as well as calling for a democratic constitution, federalism and autonomy, peace between democracies and God-fearing policies.

== History ==
The DSU was founded in Munich in 1956, following Strasser's return from exile. It aimed to serve as a political platform for Strasser's ideological vision, later termed Strasserism, which was critical of both capitalism and communism. Strasser hoped to rekindle the revolutionary energy of his pre-Hitlerian Nazism in a post-war democratic context.

The DSU never gained electoral traction and failed to win representation in the Bundestag or any state parliament.

Despite limited visibility, West German authorities monitored the party due to its radical nationalist rhetoric, although no legal action was taken.

By the early 1960s, the DSU was in decline. It suffered from internal disagreements, low membership, and an aging leadership circle centered around Strasser himself. One of these internal disagreements was a supposed letter that came to the attention of Erhard Kliese, leader of the "Socialist Workers-Centralist-Faction" within the DSU, that was apparently written by Strasser and aimed for a cooperation between the DSU and the German Freedom Party (DFP). In this letter, so it is claimed, Strasser promised to give up Strasserism ("German Socialism") as a part of the deal for cooperation, a move strongly disavowed by the faction around Kliese that went on to split from the DSU to found a new party, the Independent Workers' Party (German Socialists), in January 1962. This splinter party founded by Kliese would far outlive the original DSU, with it only being dissolved in 2014.

With a membership of around 1,000 at the time, the DSU would dissolve on 25 May 1962 and Strasser urged former DSU members to join the German Freedom Party (DFP); Strasser however was prevented from doing so himself by the DFP party faction around Hans Schikora, a former SRP member, which viewed Strasser as a traitor due to his time in exile and resistance to the Nazi regime. Strasser subsequently withdrew from active politics, though he continued writing and commenting on German affairs until his death in 1974.

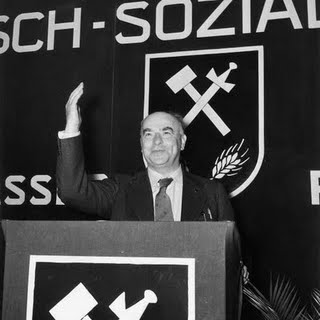
Strasser delivering a speech soon after his return to West Germany following World War II

== Ideology ==
The German Social Union was ideologically rooted in Strasser's vision of a national revolution, combining:

- Anti-capitalism, favouring decentralised economics based on cooperatives and workers' councils.
- German nationalism, including calls for German reunification and rejection of NATO and the Warsaw Pact.
- Anti-communism, especially opposition to Soviet authoritarianism.
- Christian morality, emphasizing tradition and ethical renewal.

Unlike neo-Nazi groups, the DSU rejected Hitler and his racial doctrines, advocating instead a populist and moral version of Nazism. Strasser aimed to mobilize workers under a new revolutionary and spiritual nationalism.

Strasser positioned his program as a third way between Western liberalism and Eastern communism, though his ideas failed to resonate with a West German population focused on democratic recovery and economic growth.

== Activities and Publications ==
It published Die Deutsche Revolution, a newsletter that articulated its ideological platform, and reissued several of Strasser's earlier works, including The Structure of German Socialism and Germany Tomorrow.

== Legacy ==
Scholars often cite the DSU as an example of post-war Third Positionist politics. This movement attempted, unsuccessfully, to revive ideological elements of pre-Hitlerite Nazism in a modern democratic state. Though politically marginal, the DSU remains a subject of historical interest for its attempt to formulate an alternative to both Western liberalism and Eastern communism.

== See also ==
- Fascism
- German nationalism
- German Social Union (East Germany)
- Revolutionary nationalism
- Third Position
