= Helmut Hirsch =

German Jewish artist and activist (1916–1937)

- Born: January 27, 1916; Stuttgart, German Empire
- Died: June 4, 1937 (aged 21); Plötzensee Prison, Berlin, Nazi Germany
- Cause of death: Execution by guillotine
- Citizenship: Germany (1916–1935); Stateless (1935–1937); United States (1937)
- Political party: Black Front

Helmut Hirsch (German: [ˈhɛl.muːt ˈhɪʁʃ]; January 27, 1916 – June 4, 1937) was a German Jewish artist and activist who was executed for his part in a bombing plot intended to destabilize the Third Reich. While a full and accurate account of the plot is unknown, his targets were understood to be the Nazi Party headquarters in Nuremberg, and/or the plant where the antisemitic weekly propaganda newspaper Der Stürmer was printed.

== Early life ==
Hirsch was the elder of two children of Marta Neuburger Hirsch and Siegfried Hirsch. In 1935, after the Nuremberg Laws excluded Jews from German universities, he moved to Prague, then capital of Czechoslovakia, where he enrolled as a student of architecture at the Deutsche Technische Hochschule (German Institute of Technology).

== The Black Front ==
Shortly after arriving in Prague, Hirsch became involved in the Black Front, a nationalist group of anti-Hitler German expatriates who advocated Strasserism. He was encouraged to introduce himself to its head, Otto Strasser, by his mentor, Tusk (Eberhard Köbel). Tusk had been a leader of Deutsche Jungenschaft, a branch of the German youth movement (Bündische Jugend) to which Hirsch belonged. The Jungenschaft itself was outlawed in 1935 and Tusk escaped arrest by fleeing to London.

Hirsch's family joined him in Prague in 1936, after his sister, Kaete, graduated from gymnasium (high school) and, like him, was forbidden to attend a German university. By then, he was deeply enmeshed in clandestine Black Front activities, which he kept secret from his family.

On December 20, 1936, after telling his family he was going skiing with friends, he returned to Germany with a travel permit obtained on the false premise that he was visiting his mother, who he claimed was ill. In his naiveté, he did not realize German authorities knew his family had moved to Prague. It is likely that German agents in Prague had been watching him for some months, but were unable to arrest him while he remained on Czech soil.

Hirsch's handler was Strasser's right-hand man, Heinrich Grunov, who used the nom de guerre Dr. Beer. According to the plan, Hirsch was to place two suitcases containing explosives at one or two sites in Nuremberg. The suggested targets were the Nazi Party headquarters and the office or printing plant of Der Stürmer.

Grunov instructed Hirsch to buy a round-trip ticket from Prague to his hometown, Stuttgart, but to travel only as far as Nuremberg. There he was to meet a contact, who would give him baggage claim tickets for the two suitcases, which had been smuggled into Germany. Instead, he went on to Stuttgart, where he had arranged to meet an old friend. According to letters he wrote to his family from prison, he was wavering in his commitment to the plot and hoped his friend would talk him out of the attack.

== Arrest and imprisonment ==
Hirsch arrived in Stuttgart late in the evening of December 20. When his friend failed to meet him as arranged, he checked into the Hotel Pelikan, across the street from the railway station. In the early hours of the morning of December 21, agents of the Gestapo arrested him in his hotel room.

Hirsch was interrogated, first in Stuttgart, then after his transfer to Berlin's Plötzensee Prison. He was charged with conspiracy to commit high treason, and was indicted for possession of explosives with criminal intent, despite the fact that he had no explosives at the time of his arrest. Hirsch was held in solitary confinement for nine weeks while awaiting trial. He was permitted to communicate with his family or relatives who still lived in Germany. A letter he wrote to his uncle, in Stuttgart, was held back by censors.

== Trial ==
Testimony at the trial made it clear that there was at least one double agent in the Black Front, who had informed on Hirsch. A witness for the prosecution described the plot in detail that no one but a trusted member of the Black Front could have known. Under questioning, Hirsch did not deny involvement in the plot, though the public defender assigned to his case argued that he should be acquitted since he had never carried it out. When asked whether he would, if given the chance, have attempted to assassinate Adolf Hitler, Hirsch acknowledged he would.

Although Hitler was never a target of the plot, Hirsch's response gave rise to rumors printed in the international press that Hitler's assassination had been Hirsch's goal.

Hirsch was found guilty and condemned to death. His friend was acquitted. Although the proceedings of the trial remained secret, the verdict was made public. It was only upon hearing on the radio on March 20 that "the stateless Jew, Helmut Hirsch," had been condemned to death that his family learned what had become of him after he left home three months earlier.

== International appeals for clemency ==
Hirsch's family and friends launched a campaign to free him, or at least have his sentence commuted to life in prison. The International Red Cross, the Society of Friends, and an international association of lawyers made appeals on his behalf. A human rights organization convinced the government of Norway to offer him asylum if the Germans would release him. An appeal was made to the League of Nations, and the case was brought up in the House of Commons in London.

Among the most promising avenues was the intervention of the United States. Hirsch's father, Siegfried, had lived in the United States for about ten years before his marriage in 1914. He became a naturalized American citizen before returning to Germany. During World War I, Siegfried lived with his wife and two children in the German state of Alsace. At the end of the war, when Alsace became part of France, the family moved to Stuttgart. Through a bureaucratic mix-up, the exact nature of which is unclear, Siegfried Hirsch's American citizenship was rescinded, rendering the entire family "stateless persons". Even though Hirsch was born in Germany and lived in Stuttgart for most of his life, he never held German citizenship.

Hirsch's cousin, George Neuburger, who had moved to New York, enlisted the aid of an American lawyer, Irving S. Ottenberg, who was married to Hirsch's father's first cousin. Ottenberg petitioned to have Siegfried's citizenship reinstated. Their appeal was initially rejected, but a month later the decision was reversed. On April 22, 1937, by virtue of his father's newly restored citizenship, Helmut Hirsch was also declared an American citizen, albeit he'd never set foot on American soil.

== American diplomacy ==
Hirsch's American citizenship immediately changed the situation. William E. Dodd, the American ambassador in Berlin, was instructed by Secretary of State Cordell Hull to intervene on Hirsch's behalf. Dodd chronicled his efforts in his diary. These included meetings with Konstantin von Neurath, the German Foreign Minister, and Otto Meissner, a key aide of Hitler.

Even with the force of American diplomacy, Hitler refused Dodd's eleventh-hour request that Hirsch's life be spared. His execution by decapitation was carried out at 6:00 am, June 4, 1937. His sister, Katie Sugarman (Kaete Hirsch), died in 2016 having moved to the United States and possibly spared from the Nazi regime due to her family's immediate entry due to her brother.

== See also ==
- Assassination attempts on Adolf Hitler
