= Army Group Mackensen =

Army Group Mackensen may refer to:

- Army Group Mackensen (Poland) (22 Apr 1915 – 8 Sep 1915)
- Army Group Mackensen (Serbia) (18 Sep 1915 – 30 July 1916)
- Army Group Mackensen (Romania) (28 Aug 1916 – 7 May 1918)
