= Ludwig Aßner =

German politician and attempted assassin of Adolf Hitler

Member-elect of the Bavarian Landtag
- In office Not assumed
- Succeeded by: Xaver Hirschauer

Personal details
- Born: April 6, 1893 Landsberg am Lech, Kingdom of Bavaria, German Empire
- Died: August 17, 1940 (aged 47) Le Puy-en-Velay, France
- Party: Völkisch-Social Bloc (unconfirmed)
- Occupation: Politician
- Known for: Sending a poisoned letter to Adolf Hitler in 1933

Ludwig Aßner (6 or 8 April 1893 – 17 August 1940) was a German politician known for an alleged assassination attempt on Adolf Hitler in 1933, involving a poisoned letter sent from France. He was previously elected a member of the Bavarian Landtag in the 1920s, but was barred from assuming his seat due to a criminal conviction.

== Early life and career ==
Aßner was born on either 6 or 8 April 1893 in Landsberg am Lech, in the Kingdom of Bavaria. He was elected to the Bavarian Landtag in the 1920s, but due to a criminal conviction and sentence of four months' imprisonment, he was barred from assuming his seat. His candidacy had reportedly drawn objections from Hitler himself. He was later replaced by Xaver Hirschauer.

== Assassination attempt on Adolf Hitler ==
On 9 February 1933, Aßner reportedly sent a poisoned letter to Adolf Hitler from France. According to reports, the letter was intercepted after an acquaintance warned Nazi authorities of the plan. Some sources suggest Aßner had been persuaded not to carry out the plan after being paid off.

== Death ==
Ludwig Aßner died on 17 August 1940 in Le Puy-en-Velay, France, shortly after the fall of France during World War II. French military records categorized him as a civilian victim.

== Legacy ==
Although not widely known, Aßner is among the lesser-documented early resisters of Hitler. His failed attempt reflects political dissent from within Germany's own nationalist circles prior to the full consolidation of Nazi power.
