= Beppo Römer =

German Communist (1892–1944)

- Born: Josef Römer; 17 November 1892; Munich, Bavaria, German Empire
- Died: 25 September 1944 (aged 51); Brandenburg-Görden Prison, Brandenburg an der Havel, Nazi Germany
- Cause of death: Execution by guillotine
- Known for: Plotting to assassinate Adolf Hitler
- Political party: Communist Party of Germany
- Military career
- Allegiance: Freikorps
- Branch: Freikorps Oberland

Josef "Beppo" Römer (German: [ˈbɛ.po ˈʁøː.mɐ]; 17 November 1892 – 25 September 1944) was a member of the Freikorps Oberland, one of the paramilitary organizations that sprang up around Germany as soldiers returned in defeat from World War I. He was later an organizer for the Communist Party of Germany (KPD). He was involved in German resistance to Nazism and plotted to assassinate Hitler in 1934. Römer was executed in 1944 by the Nazi regime.

== Biography ==
Römer was born in Munich, Kingdom of Bavaria. An officer during World War I, the colorful and charismatic Römer became a popular figure in the army, ending the war as a Captain. After the war, Römer naturally emerged as a Freikorps leader becoming the founder, along with Ernst Horadam and Ludwig Horadam, of Bund Oberland, the largest and most significant of the Bavarian Freikorps. Oberland was instrumental in crushing the Bavarian Soviet Republic in April 1919, fought against the Ruhr workers in March and April 1920, and was a critical factor at the battle of Annaberg which drove the Poles from Upper Silesia in 1921 during the Silesian Uprisings. By this time, however, Römer was already in contact with the Communist Party of Germany (KPD) and, when called upon to break a strike in the Silesian city of Ratibor in mid 1921, the leaders of Oberland refused to undertake the task.

By 1921, there were a number of patriotic groups in Bavaria clamoring for a restoration of the monarchy under Rupprecht, Crown Prince of Bavaria and talk of forming a break away Confederation of the Danube. Bund Oberland was against such a position and sought ways to thwart the monarchists. It appears that Römer devised a plan to harness the energies of radical workers. To do this, he contacted his childhood friend Otto Graf, KPD representative in the Bavarian parliament, and channeled some 350,000 marks in financial support to the KPD from Bund Oberland. In August 1922, during the course of an internal political struggle between Dr. Friedrich Weber's faction, which sympathized with the Nazis, and that of the original leaders, Horadam and Römer, which were more left-leaning, Römer was accused of embezzling Oberland funds to aid his friend Graf and the KPD. Römer was expelled from Bund Oberland on 15 March 1923.

With the general disbanding of the Freikorps in the early twenties, Römer returned to school, receiving a law degree in 1922. Soon thereafter, Römer began to write for the KPD periodical Aufbruch (New Start) and, after joining the KPD in 1932, he became editor in chief. he was also active in the party's intelligence service, the Antimilitärischer Apparat.

Römer opposed the Nazi regime from the beginning and, as early as 1934, actively participated in plans to assassinate Adolf Hitler with Nikolaus von Halem, which led to his arrest and imprisonment in the Dachau concentration camp until 1939. Upon his release, Römer immediately became involved with worker opposition to the Nazis, publishing a bulletin for the resistance, Informationsdienst (Information Service), creating a network of opposition workplace cells, and again laying plans for an assassination attempt on Hitler. These cells were later infiltrated by the Gestapo and Römer was arrested in February 1942 for activities related to abetting the enemy and corruption of military readiness.

Römer was sentenced to death on 16 June 1944 and executed on 25 September of that year at Brandenburg-Görden Prison in Brandenburg an der Havel.

== See also ==
- Assassination attempts on Adolf Hitler
