= Heldengedenktag =

Holiday in Nazi Germany

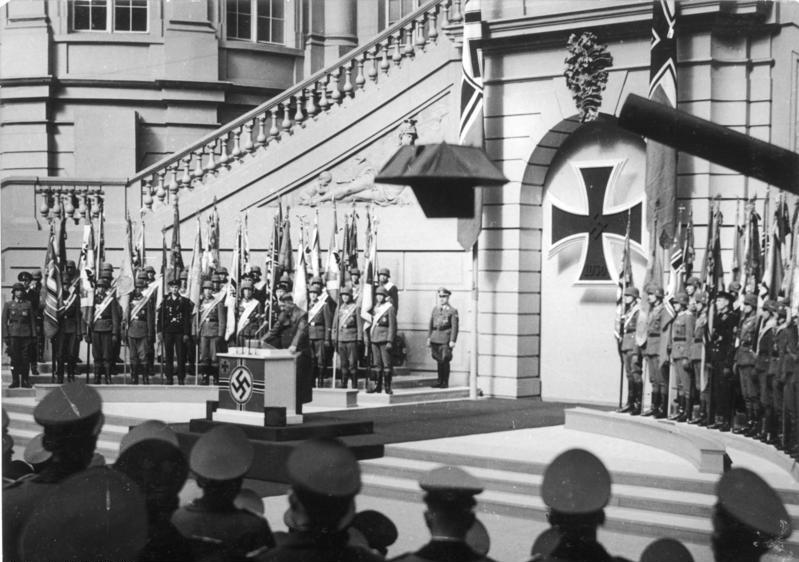
Adolf Hitler in the Berlin Zeughaus during Heldengedenktag 1943. On that occasion, Rudolf-Christoph von Gersdorff attempted to assassinate Hitler.

The Heldengedenktag ("Heroes' Memorial Day") was a holiday in Nazi Germany in commemoration of the fallen German soldiers of World War I. It was introduced on 27 February 1934 to replace the Volkstrauertag.

In the process, the Nazis completely changed the character of the holiday: the emphasis shifted to hero worship rather than remembering the dead.

Joseph Goebbels, as Propaganda Minister, issued guidelines on content and implementation, instructing that flags no longer be flown at half-mast. The 1939 order prohibited entertainment events on this day unless they had "soldierly and heroic character", at first until 6PM (from 1943, until midnight).

The last Heldengedenktag was celebrated in 1945.

== Date ==
Originally, the Heldengedenktag was observed on the fifth Sunday before Easter (Reminiscere). In 1939, it was moved to March 16, the day of the reintroduction of conscription, or on the Sunday before, if March 16 was a business day. The propaganda impact of the day was considered so significant that all crucial steps in the preparation for war up to and including 1939 were scheduled for a date very close to Heroes' Memorial Day.

- March 17 1935
- March 8 1936, one day after the remilitarisation of the Rhineland
- February 21 1937
- March 13 1938, one day after the Anschluss
- March 12 1939, three days before the occupation of Czechoslovakia
- March 10 1940
- March 16 1941
- March 15 1942
- March 21 1943 (exceptionally postponed by one week)
- March 12 1944
- March 11 1945

== See also ==
- Nazism and the Wehrmacht
- Heroes' Day

== Sources ==
- Janz, Nina (2013). Der Heldengedenktag in der Wehrmacht (PDF) (M.A. thesis) (in German). FernUniversität Hagen.

== Literature ==
- Kaisenberg, Georg (1935), "Das neue Feiertagsrecht", Archiv des öffentlichen Rechts, vol. 65, no. 1, pp. 90–101
- Petersen, Thomas Peter (1998), Die Geschichte des Volkstrauertages (PDF), Bad Kleinen: Volksbund Deutsche Kriegsgräberfürsorge
- Painter, Karen (2020). "Music and Memory on Volkstrauertag/Heldengedenktag". Musik – Kultur – Gedächtnis. Wiesbaden: Springer Fachmedien Wiesbaden. doi:10.1007/978-3-658-29609-4_14. ISBN 978-3-658-29608-7.
