= Operation Spark (1973) =

Deception operation by Syria and Egypt

Operation Spark (Hebrew: מבצע ניצוץ) was a deception operation led by Syria and Egypt, aimed towards deceiving Israel of their intention to retake the Israeli-occupied Golan Heights and the Sinai Peninsula respectively, in 1973. The operation succeeded in that Israeli intelligence was not, as a whole, able to inform a nationwide alert that war was imminent and that mobilisation should proceed apace; the established 48-hour warning had proved advantageous to Israel in previous wars, most notably the Six-Day War.

However, a number of Israeli generals, including General David Elazar, caught on to the fact that the Syrians and the Egyptians were mobilising their forces behind the ceasefire lines, preparing for offensive actions. Importantly, and arguably the fact that prevented liberation of the Golan Heights by Syrians, was the ordering of the 7th Armoured Brigade to the area, even though this was a blatant disregard of the spirit of the Israeli High Command's current directives.

Nevertheless, when war started, clearly Israel as a whole was surprised. Therefore, Operation Spark was a success, a preamble to Syrian and Egyptian initial success in the Yom Kippur War. However, as said, the initiative of some Israeli generals meant that some preparation was in place to try and resist the Arab advance.
