= Volkstrauertag =

Annual day of mourning in Germany

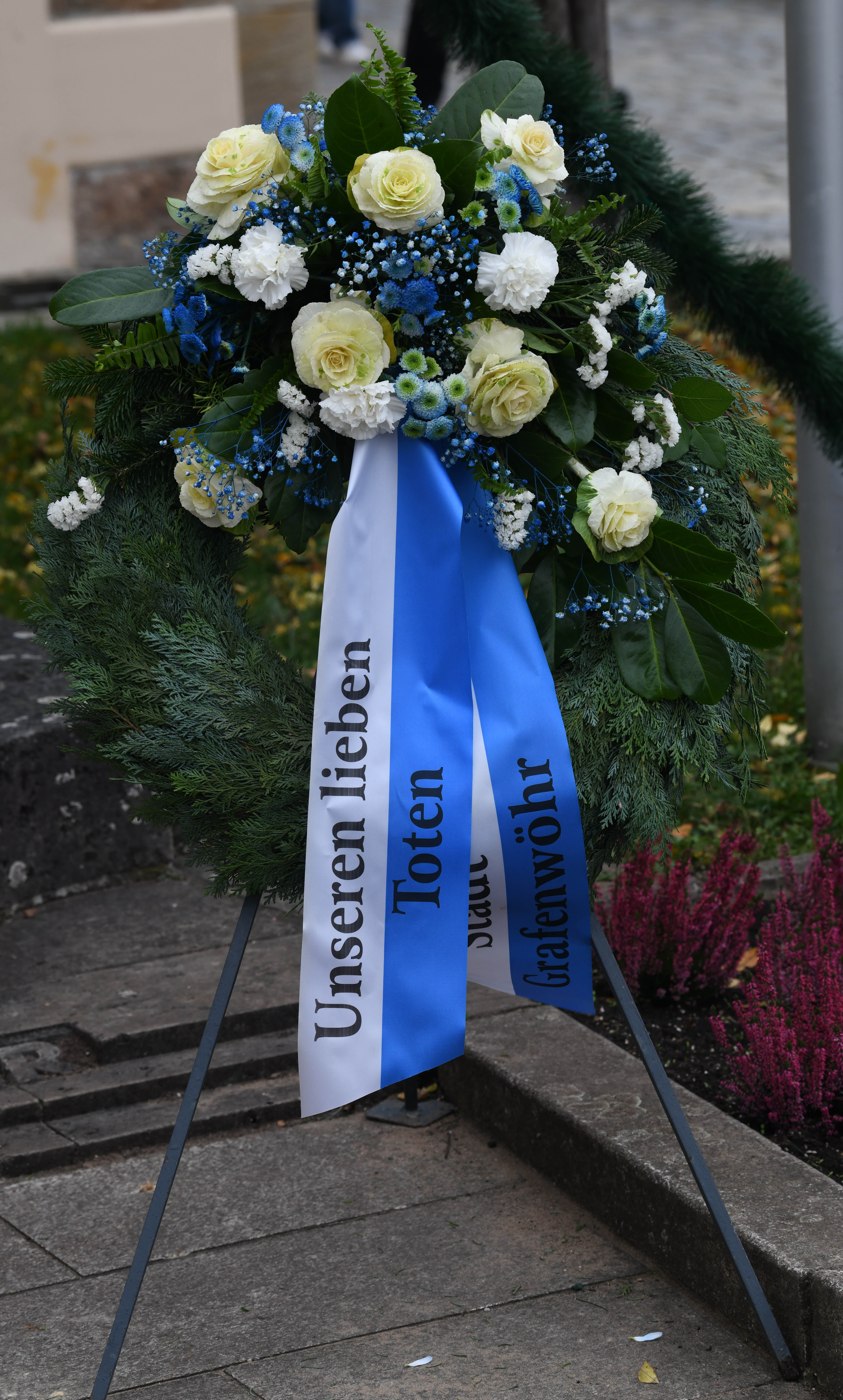
- Observed by: Germany
- Date: Second Sunday before Advent
- 2025 date: November 16
- 2026 date: November 15
- 2027 date: November 14
- 2028 date: November 19
- Frequency: Annual

Volkstrauertag (German: [ˈfɔlkstʁaʊ̯ɐˌtaːk], lit. 'people's mourning day') is a commemoration day in Germany two Sundays before the first day of Advent. It commemorates members of the armed forces of all nations and civilians who died in armed conflicts, to include victims of violent oppression. It was first observed in its modern form in 1952.

== History ==
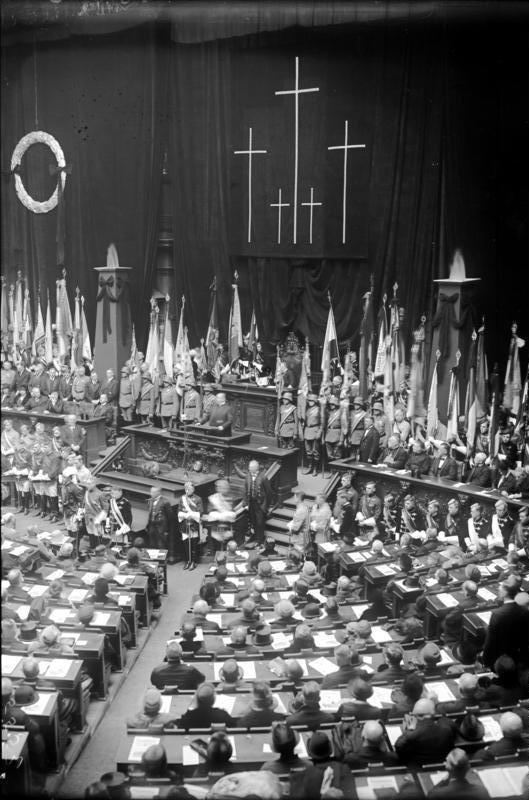
Commemoration ceremony in the Reichstag, March 1928

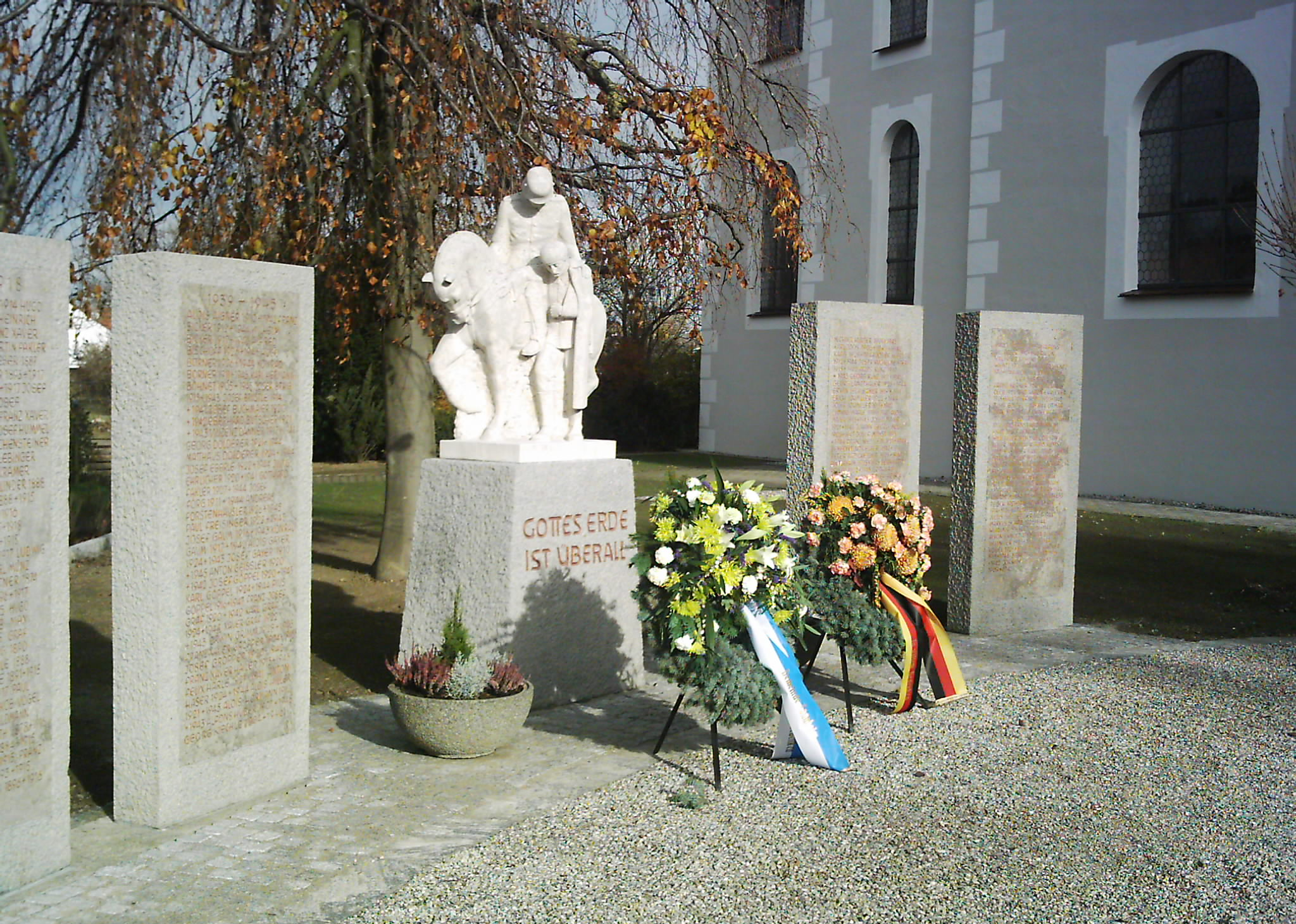
A memorial to German First and Second World War soldiers in Tannheim, Baden-Württemberg

In 1893, the Kingdom of Prussia consolidated many days of repentance and prayer celebrated by various Protestant denominations and in various German-speaking regions into Buß- und Bettag, a national work-holiday celebrated on the Wednesday before November 23.

In 1919, the German War Graves Commission (Volksbund Deutsche Kriegsgräberfürsorge) proposed a Volkstrauertag for German soldiers killed in the First World War. It was first held in 1922 in the Reichstag. In 1926, Volkstrauertag became a feature on what Catholics considered Reminiscere (the second Sunday of Lent.)

In the Weimar years, Volkstrauertag was not a legal holiday for several reasons:

- The Weimar Constitution did not make it clear whether the authority to define legal holidays lay with the Reich or the Länder (states). Over the years this led to local differences in regulations, dates, and interpretations.
- The two largest Christian churches were not in agreement over a suitable date for remembrance since each already had its own day for remembering the dead in November: the Catholic All Souls' Day and the Protestant Totensonntag. A proposed date in spring, Invocavit (the first Sunday in Lent) or Reminiscere (the second Sunday in Lent), was in Passiontide and Protestant churches often held confirmation services then.
- The political instability of the Weimar Republic obstructed some attempts to regulate the Volkstrauertag day through legislation, since the Reichstag was suspended several times in mid-term.

In 1934, the Volkstrauertag was replaced by the Heldengedenktag on Reminiscere. It became a holiday organised by the Nazi party and the Wehrmacht. Furthermore, five years later the Nazis abolished Bußtag as a non-working day and moved its commemoration to the following Sunday, to further the war effort.

After the end of World War II, Volkstrauertag was observed in its original form in West Germany, beginning in 1948. The first central meeting of the German War Graves Commission took place in 1950 in the Bundestag in Bonn. In 1952, in an effort to distinguish Volkstrauertag from Heldengedenktag, its date was changed to the end of the liturgical year, a time traditionally devoted to thoughts of death, time and eternity. Its scope was also broadened to include those who died due to the violence of an oppressive government, not just those who died in war.

== Observation ==
An official observation of Volkstrauertag takes place in the German Bundestag. The President of Germany traditionally gives a speech with the Chancellor, the cabinet and the diplomatic corps present. The national anthem and the song "Ich hatt' einen Kameraden" ("I had a comrade") are then played. Most Länder also hold their own ceremonies; veterans usually organize ceremonies that include a procession from the respective Church service to a war memorial, prayer by the pastor, speeches by the mayor and the veterans' chairmen, a military guard of honor, several wreaths are laid, and "Ich hatt' einen Kameraden"; where available, also with the attendance of a Bundeswehr officer as official representative.

Because of the relation to Advent, the date is the Sunday nearest 16 November, i.e. in the period from 13 November to 19 November.
