= Klaus Mylius =

German Indologist (1930–2025)

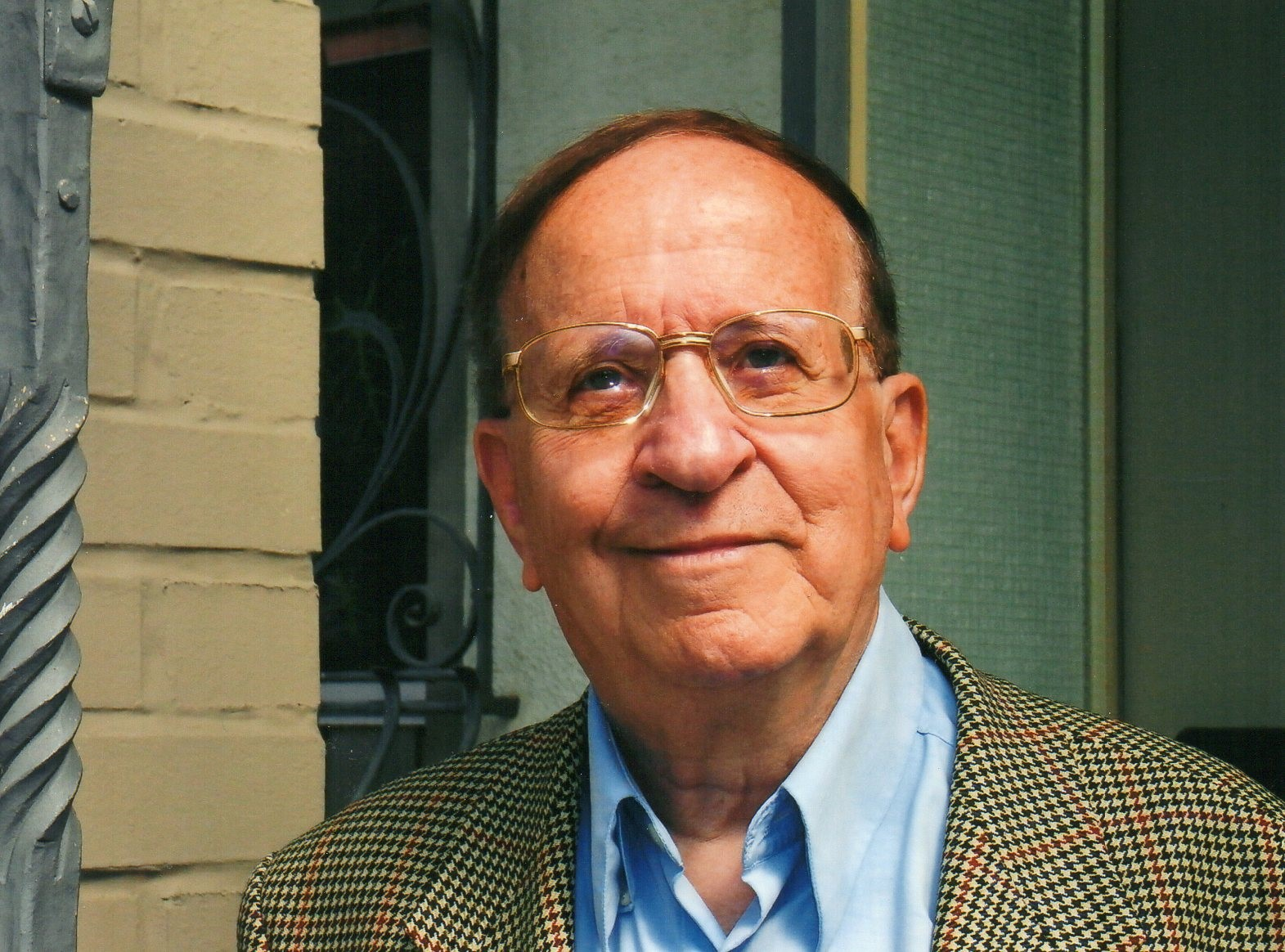
Mylius in 2018

Klaus Albert Robert Curt Mylius (24 August 1930 – 28 June 2025) was a German Indologist who was Professor of Sanskrit Studies and Indian Archaeology at the University of Leipzig until 1990, after which he was a lecturer at the universities of Bayreuth and Frankfurt am Main.

== Life and career ==
As a child in Berlin, Klaus Mylius experienced the Allied bombing raids that caused his Mylius family to lose their home three times. In 1945, the last year of the war, he was evacuated to Siegersleben (Magdeburger Börde). He then worked as a farm labourer and newspaper carrier until 1948. From 1946 to 1948, he completed a commercial apprenticeship in the Siegersleben goods distribution company. From 1948 to 1952, he took on functions within the SED, FDJ and DSF. Mylius then headed the central school for projectionists of the State Committee for Film in Halle (Saale) until 1953. From 1953 to 1955, he was a lecturer at the adult education centre of the city of Halle (Saale).

In 1954, Klaus Mylius passed a special maturity examination at the then Workers' and Peasants' Faculty (ABF) of the Martin Luther University Halle-Wittenberg (MLU). From 1954 to 1958, he studied geography at the Institute of Geography (Director: Rudolf Käubler) and from 1957 to 1961 Indology at the Institute of Indology (Director: Karl Ammer) at Halle University. Here Mylius was awarded a doctorate in geography in 1962 with a dissertation on the economic geography of Pakistan (examiners: Rudolf Käubler and Karl Ammer). In 1964, he was awarded his second doctorate in Indology on the subject of The social conditions of India after the Śatapatha Brāhmana (German: Die gesellschaftlichen Zustände Indiens nach dem Śatapatha-Brāhmana) (examiner: Karl Ammer).

Mylius habilitated at the Karl Marx University in Leipzig in 1968 with a thesis on India in Middle Vedic times presented according to Sanskrit sources (reviewers: Karl Ammer, Rigobert Günther and Walter Markov).

From 1970 to 1976, he worked at the University of Leipzig as a university lecturer in Sanskrit philology in the African and Middle Eastern Studies Section (Section Director: Gert Kück). In 1976, he became associate professor for Sanskrit and Indian antiquity here and continued to head the department of Ancient Oriental Studies. He was also a party group organiser (PO) of his party group in the SED here for a time. As an unofficial collaborator, Mylius was also active for the Ministry for State Security.

After the reunification of Germany, Mylius, who was emeritus professor in Leipzig, took on a teaching position from 1990 to 1994 at the University of Bayreuth, Institute for Religious Studies (Director: Ulrich Berner). Beginning in 1996, he was a lecturer in Sanskrit, first at the Institute for Philosophy (Director: Wilhelm K. Essler), then at the Institute for Empirical Linguistics (Director: Jost Gippert) at the Johann Wolfgang Goethe University in Frankfurt am Main.

Klaus Mylius was an internationally recognised Indologist who represented his special field of Sanskrit and Indian antiquity. He continued to realise and publish new book projects in this field.

His first marriage was to Karin Mylius, who died in 1986. He had a son and a daughter from this marriage. Mylius was married again beginning in 1989. He lived in Gottenheim near Freiburg im Breisgau. He died on 28 June 2025, at the age of 94.

== Academy membership ==
- 1986–1992: full member of the Saxon Academy of Sciences in Leipzig (philological-historical class)
- 1992–1994: corresponding member of the Saxon Academy of Sciences in Leipzig (resigned 1994)
- From 1996: elected member of the Leibniz-Sozietät der Wissenschaften zu Berlin (Class for Social Sciences and Humanities)
- From 2004: full member of the Berlin Scientific Society

== Awards ==
- 1985: Friedrich Weller Prize of the Saxon Academy of Sciences in Leipzig.
- 2000: Rabindranath Tagore Literature Prize of the Indo-German Society; awarded in equal parts to Klaus Mylius and Hans Wolfgang Schumann (the prize to Mylius was not presented due to political considerations of the chairman Hans-Georg Wieck).
- 2007: United Cultural Convention of the United States of America in connection with the United Nations in New York
- 2009: Inclusion of the biography in the ABI publication 500 Greatest Geniuses of the 21st Century

Klaus Mylius was a member of the American Biographical Institute (ABI), a Fellow of the American Biographical Institute (F.A.B.I.), an American Medal of Honor of the ABI and an International Peace Prize.

== Works ==
Klaus Mylius published more than 25 books of his own and continued until his death to be involved in almost 50 books, each of which reached several, sometimes up to 5 editions. In addition, there are about 450 scientific articles and reviews.

- Literature by and about Klaus Mylius in the German National Library catalogue
- Das Kamasutra. Deutsche Übersetzung aus dem Sanskrit und eingeleitet von Klaus Mylius. Reclam, Leipzig 1987. RUB Stuttgart 1999 ISBN 978-3150097816.
- Geschichte der altindischen Literatur. 2. überarb. u. erg. Auflage, Harrassowitz, Wiesbaden 2003 (zuerst Leipzig 1983), ISBN 3447047720.
- Sanskrit – Deutsch, Deutsch – Sanskrit. Wörterbuch. Harrassowitz, Wiesbaden 2005, ISBN 3-447-05143-4.
- Śaurasenī – Grammatik und Glossar. Harrassowitz, Wiesbaden 2018, ISBN 978-3-447-11130-0.

== Literature ==
- Lars Göhler (Hrsg.): Indische Kultur im Kontext – Rituale, Texte und Ideen aus Indien und der Welt. Festschrift für Klaus Mylius zum 75. Geburtstag. Harrassowitz, Wiesbaden 2005, ISBN 978-3-447-05207-8.
