= Eberhard von Breitenbuch =

German Army officer (1910–1980)

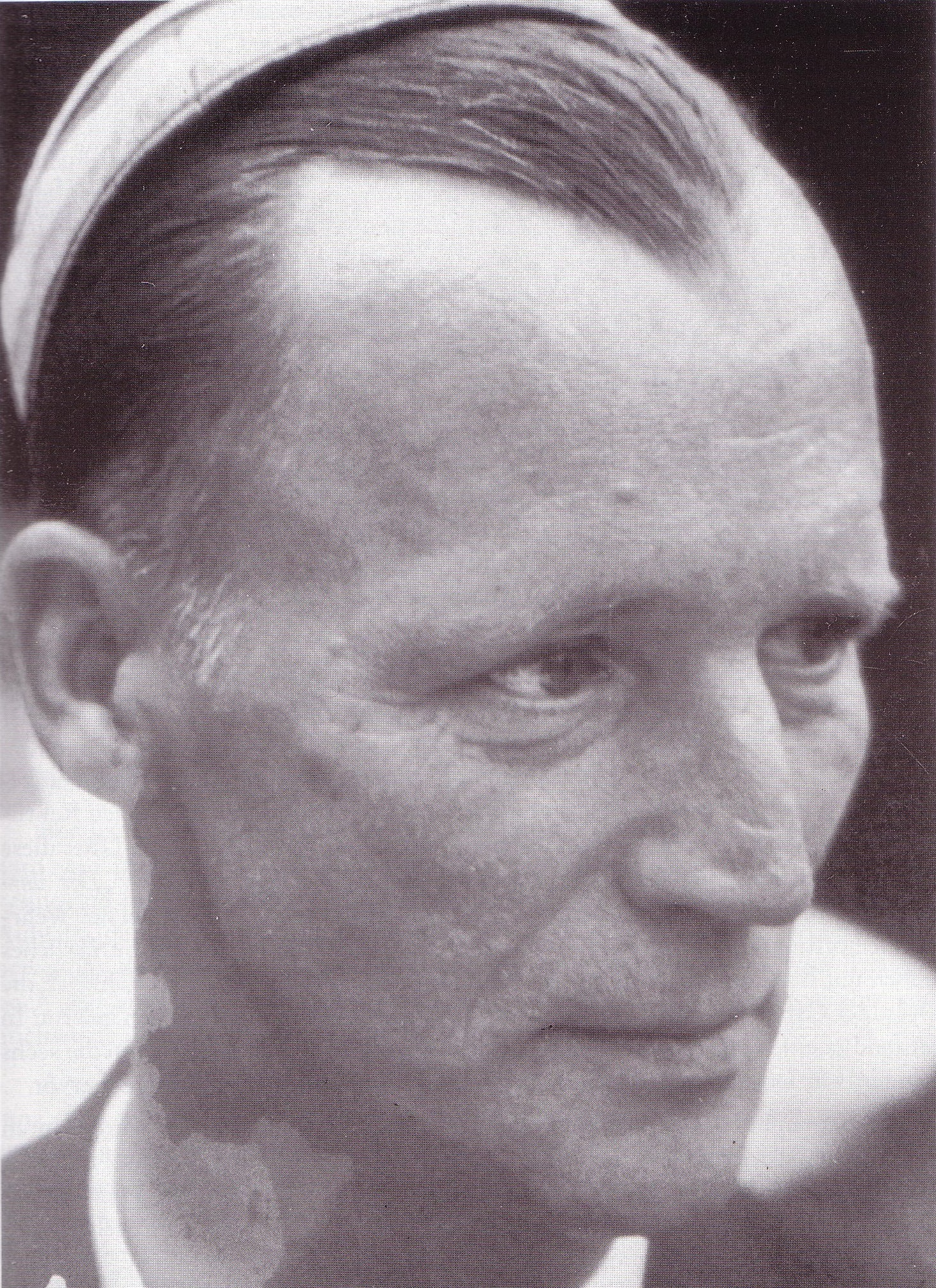
- Eberhard von Breitenbuch
- Born: 20 July 1910; Suhl, Thuringia, German Empire
- Died: 21 September 1980 (aged 70); Göttingen, West Germany
- Military career
- Branch: Army
- Rank: Reserve Rittmeister
- Unit: Army Group Centre
- Conflicts: World War II
- Awards: Knight of Justice of the Order of Saint John

Arthur Eberhard Börries Wolf von Breitenbuch (20 July 1910 – 21 September 1980) was a German cavalry officer who served in Army Group Centre of the Wehrmacht during World War II with the rank of Rittmeister and took part in the military-based conspiracy against Adolf Hitler that culminated in the 20 July Plot. Breitenbuch was a Knight of Justice of the Order of Saint John.

== Early life ==
He was born in Dietzhausen near Suhl, Thuringia, and attended the Klosterschule Roßleben convent school and the Royal Saxon Academy of Forestry. In October 1938, he married in Erfurt Marie-Luise von Einsiedel (born 1913); they had four sons and two daughters.

== Military service ==
He originally joined the army as a reserve officer. During the Second World War he served as special missions officer to Generalfeldmarschall Erwin von Witzleben and in August 1943, Henning von Tresckow arranged for him to be an aide to Generalfeldmarschall Guenther von Kluge in an attempt to gain his support for the conspiracy. When Kluge was injured in a road accident on 27 October 1943, Breitenbuch became an aide to Generalfeldmarschall Ernst Busch.

== Assassination attempt ==
On 9 March 1944, Busch and his aides were summoned to brief Hitler at the Berghof in Bavaria on 11 March. Following a debate with Tresckow, Breitenbuch agreed to attempt to assassinate the Führer by shooting him in the head using a 7.65mm Browning pistol concealed in his trouser pocket, having declined a suicide attempt using a bomb. A Condor aircraft was sent to collect Busch and Breitenbuch and he was allowed into the Berghof, but was not able to carry out the plan because SS guards had been ordered - earlier that day - not to permit aides into the conference room with Hitler.

== Post war ==
He worked in forestry after the war and died on 22 September 1980 in Göttingen after undergoing cancer surgery.

== See also ==
- Assassination attempts on Adolf Hitler
