= Black Front =

Far-right political party in the Weimar Republic

Combat League of Revolutionary National Socialists Kampfgemeinschaft Revolutionärer Nationalsozialisten
- Leader: Otto Strasser
- Founded: 4 July 1930; 96 years ago
- Banned: 15 February 1933; 93 years ago
- Split from: National Socialist German Workers' Party
- Succeeded by: German Social Union (Note: Not a legal successor)
- Newspaper: The German Revolution
- Ideology: Strasserism; Ultranationalism; Economic antisemitism Anti-capitalism
- Political position: Far-right
- Colours: Black Red

Party flag

The Combat League of Revolutionary National Socialists (German: Kampfgemeinschaft Revolutionärer Nationalsozialisten, KGRNS), more commonly known as the Black Front (German: Schwarze Front), was a political group formed by Otto Strasser in 1930 after he resigned from the Nazi Party (NSDAP) to avoid being expelled.

Strasser formed the Black Front to continue what he saw as the original anti-capitalist stance of the Nazi Party, embodied in several items of its 25-point Program of 1920 that was in large part ignored by Adolf Hitler, which Strasser saw as a betrayal. The group reflected Strasser's political views, such as revolutionary nationalism, and its criticism of capitalism was expressed in economic antisemitic terms rather than socialism.

The Black Front was composed of radical former Nazis who intended to cause a split in the party, and adopted the crossed hammer and sword symbol that is still used by several Strasserite groups. The group published a newspaper entitled The German Revolution.

The Black Front, which never had more than a couple of thousand members, was unable to effectively oppose the Nazis. Hitler’s appointment as Chancellor of Germany in 1933 effectively ended its influence. In 1934, during the Night of the Long Knives, Gregor Strasser, Otto's older brother, was killed. Gregor Strasser had previously broken with his brother over Otto's proclivity to act on his own.

Otto Strasser spent the years of the Third Reich in exile, first in Czechoslovakia (then the First Czechoslovak Republic) and later in Canada, before returning to West Germany in 1953.

== Notable members ==
- Harro Schulze-Boysen
- Bodo Uhse
- Hermann Ehrhardt
- Helmut Hirsch

== See also ==
- National Bolshevik Party
- Republican Fascist Party
- Socialist Reich Party
- Strasserism
