= Helmut Mylius =

German industrialist, leader of the Party of the Radical Middle Class

Dr. Helmut Mylius (10 November 1891 – 24 October 1973) was a German industrialist, leader of the Party of the Radical Middle Class (Radikale Mittelstandspartei), and since 1930 the editor of the Frankfurt-based right-wing political and economics weekly publication, Die Parole der radicalen Staats-und Wirtschaftreform. He was accused of conspiracy to assassinate Adolf Hitler during 1935. He managed to avoid arrest due to the influence of his friend, General Erich von Manstein and made his way to the Army as a Quartermaster.
