= Constantin Teodorescu =

Constantin Teodorescu may refer to

- Constantin Teodorescu (general) (1863–1942), Romanian World War I military general
- Constantin C. Teodorescu (1892–1972), Romanian engineer
