= Tutrakan Municipality =

Tutrakan Municipality Община Тутракан
- Municipality
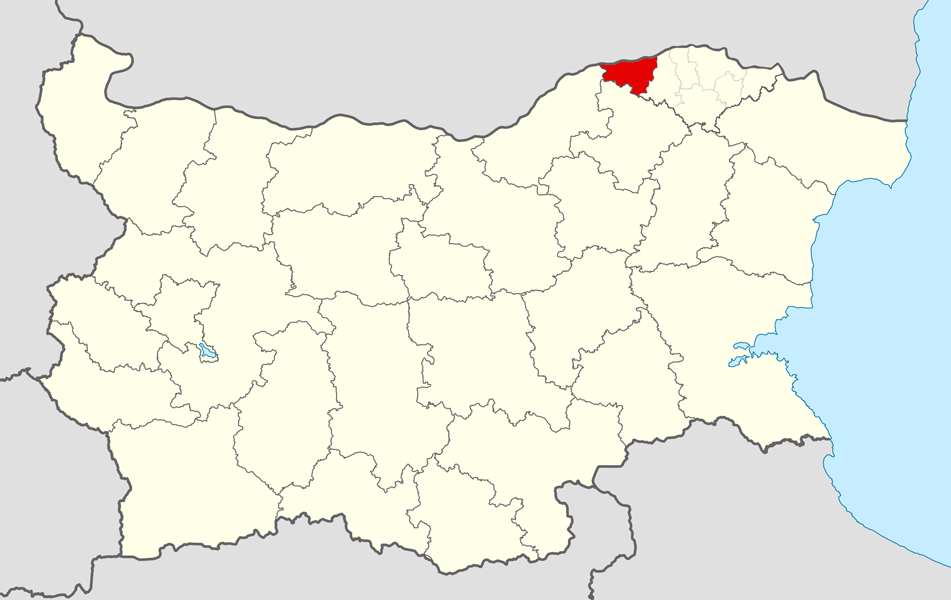
- Tutrakan Municipality within Bulgaria and Silistra Province.
- Coordinates: 43°59′N 26°34′E
- Country: Bulgaria
- Province (Oblast): Silistra
- Admin. centre (Obshtinski tsentar): Tutrakan

Area
  - Total: 448.35 km^{2} (173.11 sq mi)

Population (December 2009)
  - Total: 16,920
  - Density: 37.74/km^{2} (97.74/sq mi)
- Time zone: UTC+2 (EET)
  - Summer (DST): UTC+3 (EEST)

Tutrakan Municipality (Bulgarian: Община Тутракан) is a municipality (obshtina) in Silistra Province, Northeastern Bulgaria, located along the right bank of Danube river in the Danubian Plain. It is named after its administrative centre - the town of Tutrakan.

The municipality embraces a territory of 448.35 km² with a population of 16,920 inhabitants, as of December 2009.

The main road 21 crosses the area from east to west, connecting the province centre of Silistra with the city of Ruse.

== Settlements ==
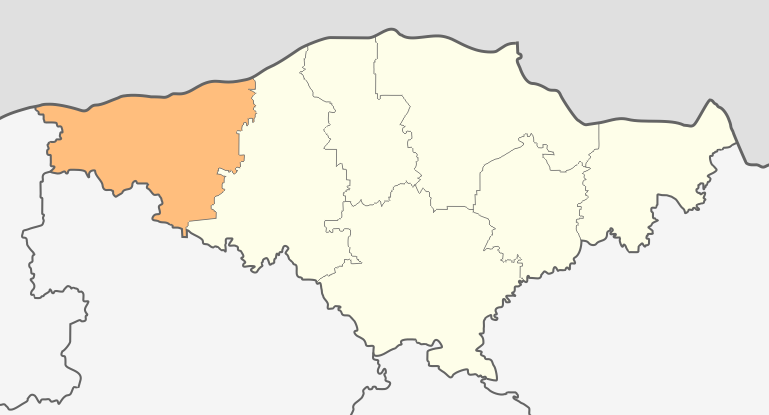
Tutrakan Municipality within Silistra Province

Tutrakan Municipality includes the following 15 places (towns are shown in bold):

Town/Village	Cyrillic	Population (December 2009)
**Tutrakan**	**Тутракан**	9,476
Antimovo	Антимово	60
Belitsa	Белица	612
Brenitsa	Бреница	234
Dunavets	Дунавец	20
Nova Cherna	Нова Черна	1,763
Pozharevo	Пожарево	129
Preslavtsi	Преславци	574
Staro Selo	Старо село	997
Shumentsi	Шуменци	548
Syanovo	Сяново	112
Tarnovtsi	Търновци	447
Tsar Samuil	Цар Самуил	1,486
Tsarev Dol	Царев дол	81
Varnentsi	Варненци	381
Total		16,920

== Demography ==
The following table shows the change of the population during the last four decades.

Tutrakan Municipality
**Year**	1975	1985	1992	**2001**	2005	2007	2009	**2011**
**Population**	24,698	23,439	21,774	19,309	17,922	17,419	16,920	...
Sources: Census 2001, Census 2011, „pop-stat.mashke.org“,

=== Ethnic groups ===
Ethnic Bulgarians constitute the largest ethnic group in Tutrakan Municipality, followed by ethnic Turks and Roma people.

Ethnic groups in Tutrakan Municipality (2011 census)
Ethnic group	Percentage
Bulgarians	67.3%
Turks	26.7%
Roma	5.1%
others and indefinable	0.9%

==== Religion ====
According to the latest Bulgarian census of 2011, the religious composition, among those who answered the optional question on religious identification, was the following:

Religious composition of Tutrakan Municipality
Orthodox Christianity	61.7%
Catholicism	0.4%
Protestantism	0.6%
Islam	23.6%
No religion	3.6%
Prefer not to answer, others and indefinable	10.1%

== See also ==
- Provinces of Bulgaria
- Municipalities of Bulgaria
- List of cities and towns in Bulgaria
