= Panteley Kiselov =

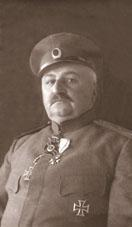
- Born: 23 October 1863; Svishtov, Ottoman Empire
- Died: 14 October 1927 (aged 63); Sofia, Bulgaria
- Military career
- Allegiance: Bulgaria
- Branch: Bulgarian Army
- Service years: 1885–1918
- Rank: General
- Commands: 5th Danube Regiment; 8th Littoral Regiment; 4th Preslav Infantry Division
- Conflicts: Vidin; Kirk Kilisse; Turtucaia
- Awards

Panteley Georgiev Kiselov (Bulgarian: Пантелей Георгиев Киселов) (23 October 1863 – 14 October 1927) was a Bulgarian soldier and general who fought in the Serbo-Bulgarian War of 1885, the Balkan Wars of 1912–1913 and World War I. He is best known as commander of the 4th Preslav Infantry Division during the Romanian Campaign of 1916 and victor of the Battle of Tutrakan.

== Biography ==
Born in Svishtov in 1863, Panteley was the third child born to Georgi Kiselov and his wife Tomitsa Kiselova. His three brothers were named Simeon, Iliya and Angel and his two sisters were named Elena and Eudikia. Georgi was a wealthy merchant who desired his children to succeed him in the family business and accordingly took special care for their education, enrolling them in the local school of Svishtov and even hiring a personal tutor to oversee their progress. Panteley was eager to study foreign languages, especially French, and a special relation with his tutor Georgi Borov who provided the young boy with the various books he was interested in.

On 28 June 1877, Russian units crossed the Danube, liberated Svishtov and established their base of operations in the town. The soldiers were met with euphoria by the local Bulgarian population, including the then fourteen-year-old Panteley Kiselov. The boy interacted with different Russian officers and soldiers and expressed a desire to serve in the military. After the war he learned that a military school was to be opened in the new Bulgarian capital of Sofia and decided to continue his education there. Georgi Kiselov support the decision of his son but soon after he lost a great part of his fortune in unsuccessful business deals, succumbed to illness and died.

In 1880, Panteley was also wounded accidentally by his younger brother Angel who was playing with a Russian revolver without realizing that the gun was loaded. Still he was able to recover from the wound and enter the Sofia Military school in 1880. During the years in the school, he learned Russian and once again proved to be an excellent student. On 30 July 1883, the students celebrated their graduation by parading in honor of Prince Alexander Batenberg, who was celebrating his name day and from whom the young soldiers received their first promotion to officer rank. Following the graduation Panteley Kiselov was assigned to the 15th Infantry Battalion, which at the time was stationed in his home town of Svishtov.

=== Serbo-Bulgarian War ===
After the Serbo-Bulgarian War broke out, Lieutenant Kiselov and his company were sent to defend the fortress of Vidin where he received his first baptism of fire. The town was soon besieged by numerically superior Serbian forces but its garrison remained firm and repulsed all their attacks until the end of the war.

On 1 January 1888. Kiselov was promoted to captain and assigned commander of the border guards in Svishtov. The next decade of his life Panteley spent in his home town where he married and created a family. He and his wife had three children – Georgi, Aleksandar and Tatiana

On 1 January 1899, while he was serving in Varna, he was promoted to the rank of major and received the command of an infantry battalion. In 1908, he was unexpectedly recalled to Sofia and assigned commandant of the city for several months but was soon dispatched by the Bulgarian General Staff to receive further training in France. He spent one year serving with the French 82nd Regiment in the town of Montjoi. Upon his return to Bulgaria Kiselov was promoted to colonel and assigned commander of the 5th Danube regiment in Ruse. On the eve of the First Balkan War he was reassigned to Varna and received the command of the 8th Primorski regiment.

=== Balkan Wars ===
On 17 September 1912, the Bulgarian Tsar Ferdinand declared the general mobilization of the army. The order was relayed to Kiselov and accepted with great joy by him and his soldiers. Within six days the regiment was fully mobilized and could field 70 officers, 4 clerks and 4716 soldiers in four battalions and armed with 4,476 rifles or carbines, 4 heavy machine guns and 29 sabers. On 4 October, the 8th regiment marched out of Varna towards the assembly area of the 4th Preslav Infantry Division, to which it belonged. The 4th Division was assigned to the Bulgarian Third army under General Radko Dimitriev which was tasked with the attack on the fortress of Kirk Kilisse. Colonel Kiselov's regiment was part of the divisions vanguard when it advanced into Ottoman territory and was soon engaged in heavy fighting around the village of Seliolu. The Bulgarians managed to defeat the Ottomans in the Battle of Kirk Kilisse but did not pursue immediately their retreating opponent. Thus the Ottoman were able to entrench on a new defensive further south, around Lule Burgas. Thus the 4th Division and its regiments found itself involved in the thick of the fighting once again. The battle was so ferocious that at some point the determination of the soldiers of the 8th Regiment wavered. Colonel Kiselov understood this and decided to bolster the morale of his troops by making a personal example of bravery. So he rode forward and personally led the soldiers in the attack. The Battle of Lule Burgas once again ended in Bulgarian victory but it had inflicted on the victor some 20,000 casualties, so the Bulgarian High Command ordered the troops to reorganize and rest for another several days. Following this battle the fourth division participated in the fighting on the Chataldzha line and remained on that line until the end of the war.

Shortly after the end of the First Balkan War the Bulgarian Army was ordered to engage in a much shorter but an even costlier conflict that was the Second Balkan War. The 4th division, including the 8th Regiment, was now part of the Bulgarian Fourth Army which was facing the Serbians in Vardar Macedonia. Following the unsuccessful Bulgarian attack in the Battle of Bregalnica the 4th Army retired on positions around the village of Kalimantsi. On 24 June Colonel Kiselov was assigned commander of the 7th Division's rearguard which was occupying the defensive line. Here he managed to convince his superiors not to abandon the positions and instead resist the advancing Serbians. This act allowed the 2nd Bulgarian Division to safely withdraw to its new line and ensured Bulgarian success in the Battle of Kalimantsi. Nevertheless, Bulgaria was forced to ask its enemies for peace and the Second Balkan War officially ended with the humiliating Treaty of Bucharest.

Following the war Panteley Kiselov received the command of the 2nd Brigade of the 4th Infantry division. In April 1914, however, he was made commander of the entire division.

=== First World War ===
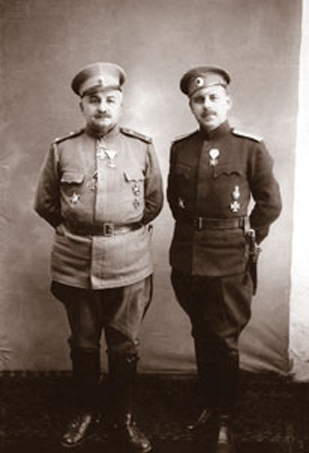
Maj. Gen. Kiselov with his chief of staff Lt. Col. Noykov following the fall of Tutrakan.

Bulgaria entered the World War on the side of the Central Powers in 1915. The 4th Division was again part of the Third Army which was tasked with the defense of the Danube against possible Romanian incursions. In late August 1916 Romania declared war on Austria-Hungary. In returned Bulgaria fulfilled the obligations to its allies and declared war on Romania on 1 September 1916. On the same day Kiselov was promoted to major general.

The Bulgarian Third Army unleashed the first major offensive of the Central Powers against their new enemy. General Kiselov's division had the crucial task of capturing the important fortress of Tutrakan located on the shores of the Danube. Within a couple of days the Bulgarians and a small German detachment besieged the town which boasted a large Romanian garrison. On 5 September General Kiselov gave the order for the attack of the main defensive line of the fortress. The task was completed only after a day of heavy fighting and great losses. The fall of the main defensive line however left the Romanians with only their second line which was incomplete. Thus the Bulgarian attack on 6 September proved unstoppable and forced the surrender of the remaining Romanian troops. The Battle of Tutrakan ended in a decisive Bulgarian victory which held vital importance for the entire campaign. Some 480 Romanian officers, 28,000 soldiers and 120 artillery guns were captured and even the German Kaiser celebrated the victory with a champagne party for the Bulgarian representatives at the German High Command.

During the battle General Kiselov maintained full command independence and even allowed himself to disobey the orders of field marshal Mackensen, who was the supreme commander of the Bulgarian, German and Ottoman forces for the invasion of Dobrudja. After this engagement he became one of the most well known and respected Bulgarian commanders.

Following the Battle of Tutrakan the Bulgarian Third army continued its advance deeper into Romanian territory. The 4th division and general Kiselov took part in all of the remaining major battles in this theater and achieved great success against Romanian and Russian forces it faced. Thus the campaign ended in success after four months of struggle. The Bulgarian High Command felt free to transfer the 4th division to the Macedonian Front in early 1917, where the general received his promotion to the rank of lieutenant general and remained until the very end of the war following the Vardar Offensive of 1918.

=== Later life ===
Following the Great War, Panteley Kiselov was promoted to General of the Infantry, which was the highest rank in the Bulgarian Army, and moved with his family to Sofia where he died following a heart attack on 14 October 1927.

== Awards ==
- Order of Bravery, 1st class
- Order of St Alexander, 3rd class with swords and 5th class without swords
- Order of Military Merit, 4th class
- German Iron Cross (1914), 1st and 2nd class
- Ottoman War Medal ("Gallipoli Star", "Iron Crescent")

== Sources ==
The general who liberated Dobrudzha

- Kazandzhiev, G. (2006). General ot pehotata Panteley Kiselov – epopeya na edin zhivot [General of the Infantry Panteley Kiselov – The Epic of a Life] (in Bulgarian). Dobrich: Izdatelstvo Matador.
- Glenn E. Torrey, "The Battle of Turtucaia (Tutrakan) (2–6 September 1916): Romania's Grief, Bulgaria's Glory".East European Quarterly, Vol. 37, 2003
