= Tutrakan =

Tutrakan Тутракан Тurtucaia Тurtukaya
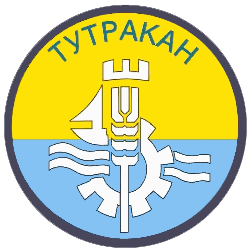
- Coat of arms

- Location of Tutrakan
- Coordinates: 44°3′N 26°37′E
- Country: Bulgaria
- Province (Oblast): Silistra

Government
  - Mayor: Dimitar Stefanov
- Elevation: 107 m (351 ft)

Population (2020)
  - Total: 9,214
- Time zone: UTC+2 (EET)
  - Summer (DST): UTC+3 (EEST)
- Postal Code: 7600
- Area code: 0866

Tutrakan (Bulgarian: Тутракан [ˈtutrɐkan], Romanian: Тurtucaia, Turkish: Turtukaya) is a town in northeastern Bulgaria, an administrative centre of the homonymous municipality, part of Silistra Province. It is situated on the right bank of the Danube opposite the Romanian town of Oltenița (to which it was linked through a ferry but the ferry does not work anymore), in the very west of Southern Dobruja, 58 km east of Rousse and 62 km west of Silistra.

== History ==
The town was founded by the Ancient Romans in the end of the first half of the 1st century under the name Transmarisca. The settlement was part of the Roman military boundary in the 1st and 3rd century and reached its apogee in the 4th century, when, under the personal management of Diocletian, it was made one of the largest strongholds of the Danubian limes.

The ancient town and fortress were destroyed in the beginning of the 7th century and the modern town carrying its present name emerged in the end of the century, remaining a military centre through the Middle Ages as part of the Bulgarian Empire, which was conquered by the Ottomans in the late 14th century.

Tutrakan was stormed twice during the Russo-Turkish War in 1773.

Tutrakan was liberated from Ottoman rule during the Russo-Turkish War of 1877-78 by Russians to become part of the Kingdom of Bulgaria. After the Second Balkan War, it was incorporated, along with all of Southern Dobruja, in Romania until 1940, when the pre-World War II Treaty of Craiova returned the territory to Bulgaria.

During World War I, the town, then part of Romania, was the site of the important Battle of Tutrakan during which Bulgarian and German Central Powers forces defeated the Romanian forces.

Today it remains a vibrant fishing village, and the historic Fisherman's Quarter continues to attract tourists, bicyclists, boaters and artists.

== Geography ==
The town is 58 km east of Ruse, 62 km west of Silistra, and 74 km north of Razgrad. Its port facilitates communications and determines the significant place that Tutrakan has occupied and occupies in its historical development.

The city is located at 26°36' east longitude and 44°03' north latitude. The altitude is 13 m from the river bank, and the plateau (the flat part of the city), located 500 m from the river, reaches 126 m.

== Religion ==
- Orthodox community
- Muslim community (Islam)
- Adventist community
- Protestant community

== Notable people ==
- Angel Cheshmedzhiev
- Dobri Nemirov
- Nikola Mavrodinov (1904 – 1958), book publisher from XIX – XX c.
- Petar Mavrodinov (1873 – 1948), teacher, book publisher and public figure
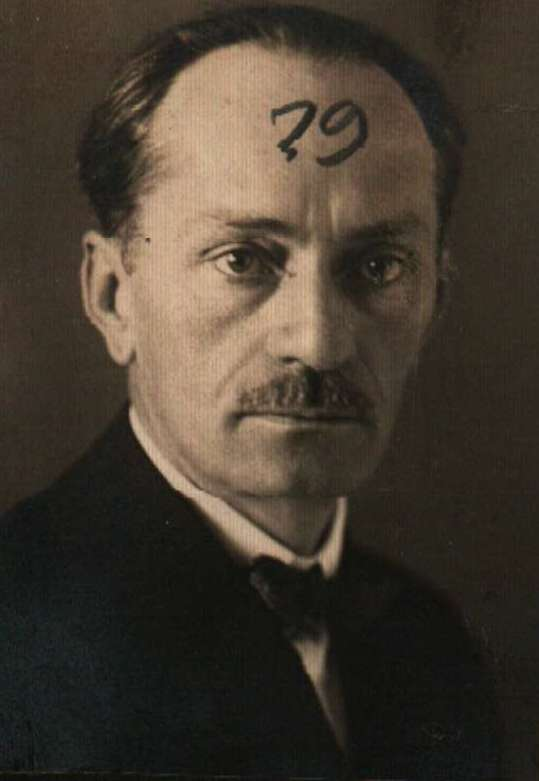
- Dobri Nemirov
  Tita, singer

== Honours ==
Tutrakan Peak in Antarctica is named after the town.

== Gallery ==
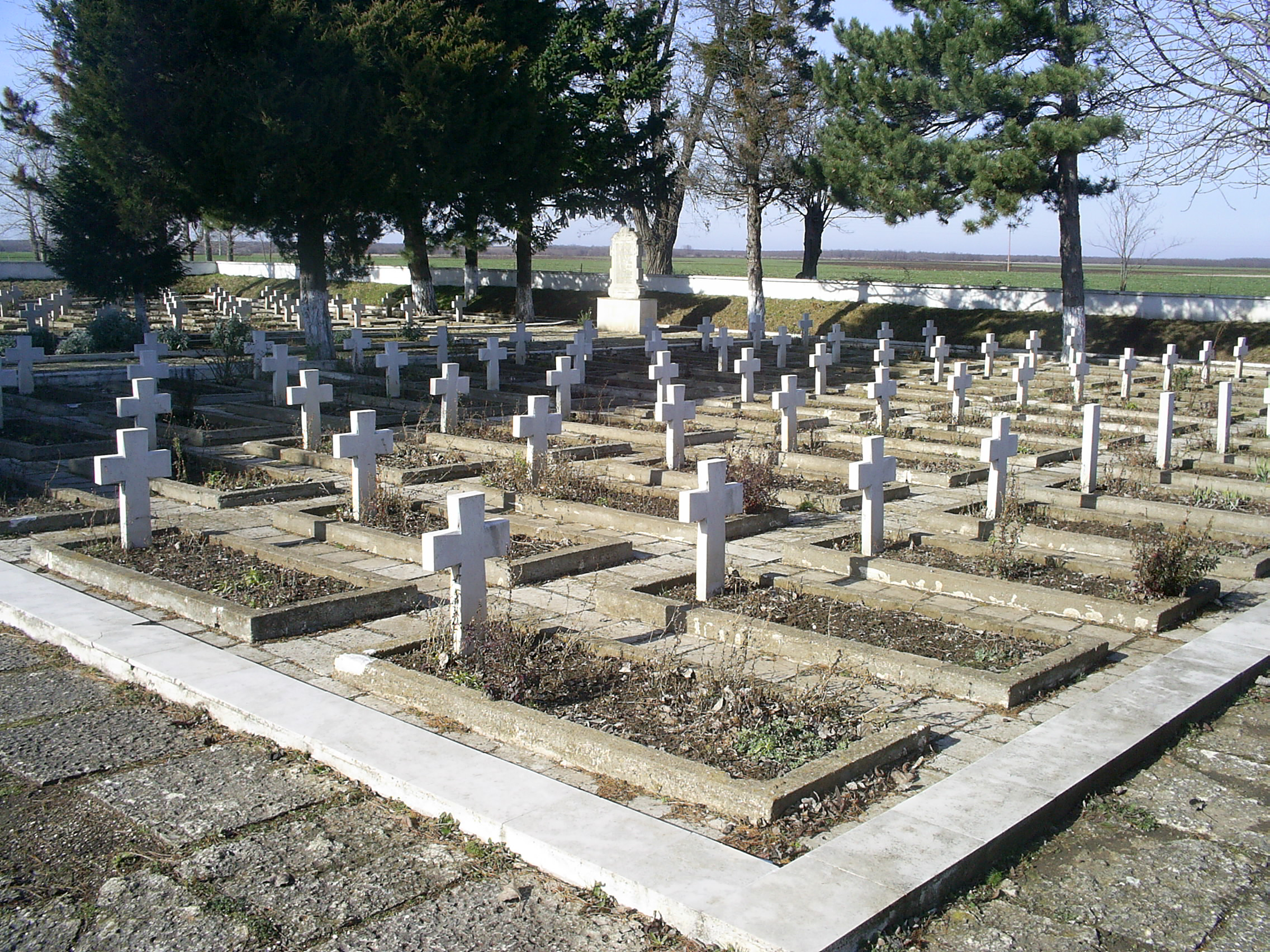
1764 Bulgarian soldiers rest in the military cemetery in Tutrakan

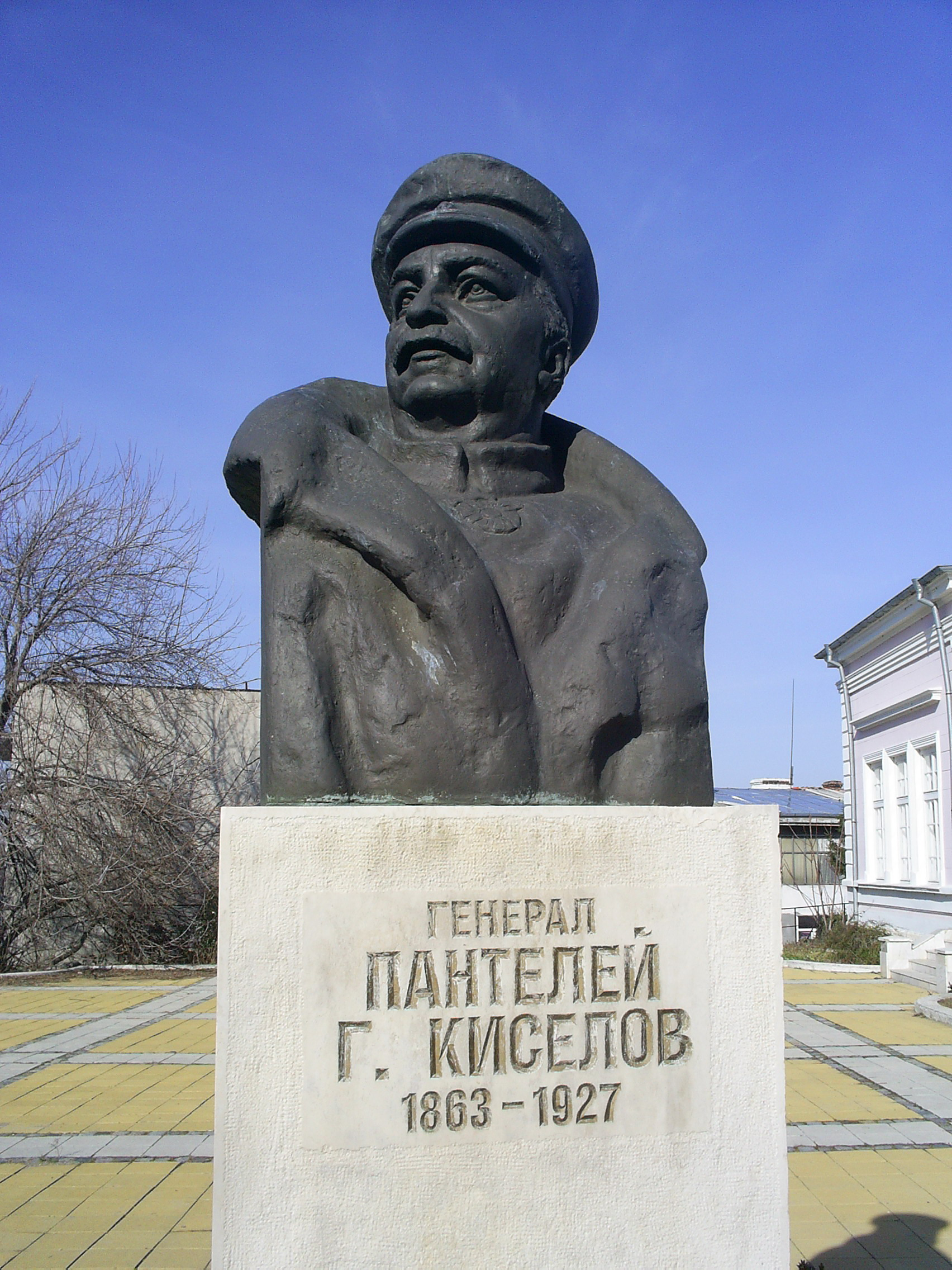
Monument of Bulgarian general Panteley Kiselov, who liberated a part of South Dobrudja during the First World War.
