= Tsar Samuil, Silistra Province =

Tsar Samuil Цар Самуил
- Location within Bulgaria
- Coordinates: 43°58′N 26°24′E
- Country: Bulgaria
- Province (Oblast): Silistra
- Municipality (Obshtina): Tutrakan
- Time zone: UTC+2 (EET)
  - Summer (DST): UTC+3 (EEST)

Tsar Samuil (Bulgarian: Цар Самуил, Turkish: Kütüklü, Romanian: Țar Samuil) is a village on the Danube, in northeastern Bulgaria, part of Tutrakan Municipality, Silistra Province.
