= Stormings of Turtucaia =

1773 engagements of the Russo-Turkish War (1768–74)

Stormings of Turtucaia (1773)
- Part of the Russo-Turkish War of 1768–1774
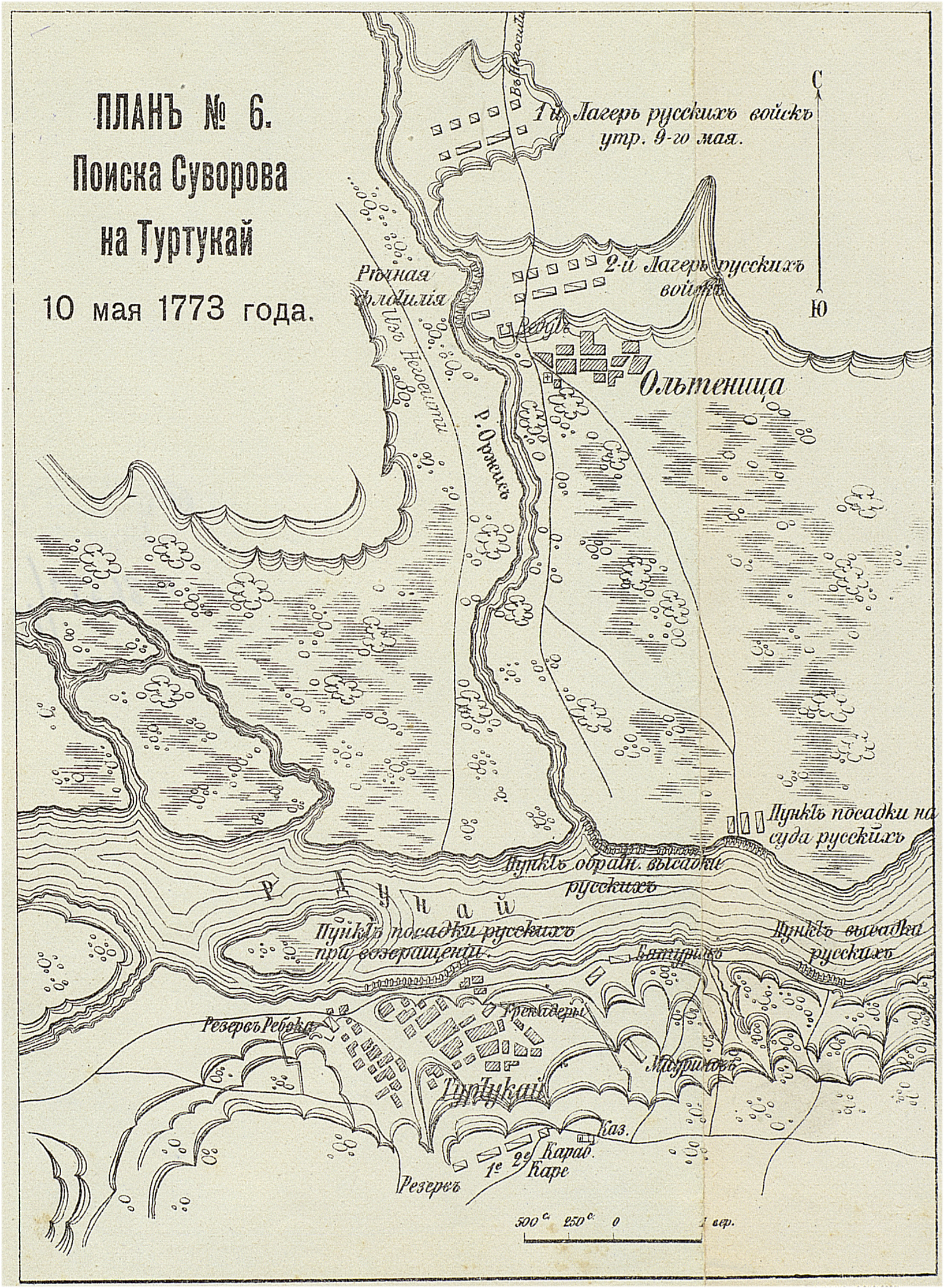
- Suvorov's plan of action at Turtucaia (21 May)
| Date | 21 May: 1st engagement 28 June: 2nd engagement |
| Location | Turtucaia (Turtukaya), Ottoman Bulgaria; part of the Ottoman Empire (Note: Modern Tutrakan, Republic of Bulgaria) |
| Result | Russian victory |

Belligerents
| Russian Empire | Ottoman Empire |

Commanders and leaders
| Alexander Suvorov; Maj. Rehbock | Feyzullah Pasha (1st engagement); Sari Mehmet Pasha (2nd engagement) |

Strength
| 710 (1st engagement) >2,500 (2nd engagement) | approx. 4,000 (1st engagement) >4,000 (2nd engagement) |

Casualties and losses
| 88–200 killed, wounded (1st engagement) Up to 150–200 (2nd engagement) | <1,500 (1st engagement) 600–800 (2nd engagement) |

The first storming of Turtucaia (Turtukaya) and the second storming of Turtucaia (Note: Russian: Штурм Туртукая) were two separate military engagements between the Russian and Ottoman armies during the Russo-Turkish War (1768–1774). They took place on 21 May and 28 June respectively, in 1773. (Note: Old Style dates: 10 May & 17 June, 1773) The Ottoman stronghold of Turtucaia (now Tutrakan), its adjacent fortifications (redoubts, retrenchments) and camps were twice attacked by Russian reconnaissance.

The first engagement ended in Russian victory under Suvorov's leadership; he seized the city of Turtucaia itself by driving the Turks out of the houses that they had occupied during this engagement. The second engagement began under Russian Major Rehbock (in accordance with the disposition); he managed to capture the retrenchments, and was completed with the reinforcements of Suvorov. In spite of Colonel Baturin's disorderliness, who lined up two infantry squares on the mountain and did not support Rehbock, as he should have done according to the disposition of personnel, and thus almost led the Russians to defeat, the second engagement also ended in Russian victory. In the second engagement, Russian forces were again at a severe disadvantage, as Suvorov was ill and was to battle against the brave and able Egyptian commander in Sari Mehmet Pasha, who had elite troops, but nonetheless won.

== Sources ==
- Petrushevsky, Alexander (1884). "Первая турецкая война: Туртукай, Гирсово, Козлуджи; 1773—1774" [First Turkish War: Turtukaya, Hirsovo, Kozludzhi; 1773—1774]. Генералиссимус князь Суворов [Generalissimo Prince Suvorov] (in Russian). Vol. 1 (1st ed.). Saint Petersburg: Типография М. М. Стасюлевича. pp. 149–161.
- Petrov, Andrey N. (1874). Война России с Турцией и Польскими конфедератами. с 1769—1774 год [Russia's war with Turkey and the Polish confederates] (in Russian). Vol. IV. St. Petersburg: Типография К. В. Трубникова. pp. 29–34, 65–69.
- Leer, G. (1878). Очерк военных действий в Турции [An outline of military operations in Turkey] (in Russian). S.Petersburg.
