= Constantin Teodorescu (general) =

Romanian general in World War I

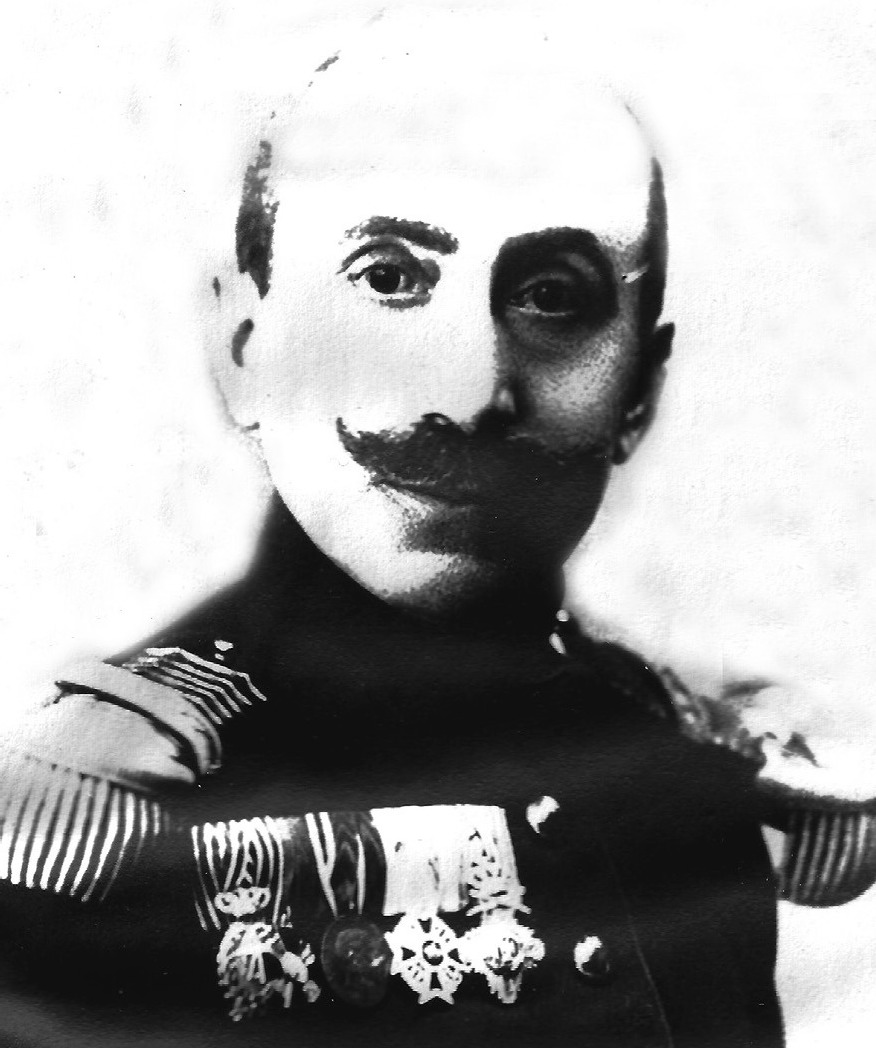
- Born: 25 January 1863
- Died: 1942 (aged 78–79); Bucharest, Romania
- Military career
- Allegiance: Kingdom of Romania
- Service years: 1883 — 1916
- Rank: Lieutenant (1883); Lieutenant (1887); Captain (1893); Major (1900); Lieutenant-Colonel (1903); Colonel (1911); Brigadier General (1915)
- Commands: 17th Infantry Division
- Conflicts: Second Balkan War; World War I; Battle of Turtucaia
- Awards: Order of the Crown; Order of the Star of Romania

Constantin Teodorescu was one of the generals of the Romanian Army in the First World War. He is most known for serving as division commander in the 1916 campaign.

== Military career ==
Constantin Teodorescu attended the classes of the School of Non-Commissioned Officers in Bucharest between 1881 and 1883, after graduating from which he was admitted to take the graduation exam of the Military School of Infantry and Cavalry, which he passed in 1883 with the rank of lieutenant. Subsequently, Teodorescu held various positions in the infantry units or in the upper echelons of the army, the most important being those of Deputy Chief of Staff of the Second Army Corps, commander of the IV Ilfov Regiment no. 21, senior director of the Personnel Directorate of the Ministry of War or head of the Mobilization Section of the General Staff.

During World War I he served as commander of the 17th Infantry Division, between 14 and 24 August 1916. The 17th Division was tasked with defending the head of the Turtucaia bridge.

Due to the faulty way of exercising the act of command by the superior military leadership of the army (head of the General Headquarters, commander of the 3rd Army, commanders of the 17th, 9th and 19th Infantry Divisions), after only five days of fighting, Bulgarian-German troops win at the Battle of Turtucaia. General Radu R. Rosetti identified as one of the main causes of losing the battle the lack of any qualities of General Teodorescu. He was relieved of the command of the division on 24 August 1916, later performing secondary functions such as that of commander of the Territorial Command of the 6th Infantry Division.

== Works ==
- Military geography course of Romania and neighboring countries by Colonel Teodorescu C., Professor of military geography at the Răsboiu High School and at the Special Infantry School. *With an introduction by Mr. General Ionescu, G., Director of the Geographical Service of the Army. Vol. I. General information on Europe, Russia, Austria-Hungary and the Balkan Peninsula. The theaters of operations of: Bessarabia, Galicia, Bukovina, Transylvania, Bulgaria, and Serbia. With 28 sketches in the text. Bucharest (Albert Baer), 1912
- Military geography course of Romania and neighboring countries by Colonel Teodorescu C., Professor of military geography at the Răsboiu High School and at the Special Infantry School. With an introduction by Mr. General Ionescu, G., Director of the Geographical Service of the Army. Vol II. Romania. Work approved and recommended to troops and military schools by order of the Ministry of War (General Staff) No. 11395 of 15 March 1912. With 35 sketches, 2 colored plans and 4 views in the text. Bucharest (Carol Gobl Institute of Graphic Arts Sister Ion St. Rasidescu), 1912
- Military geography [by] Colonel Teodorescu C. Ed. II. Revised and added based on the latest alterations to the Balkans from 1912 to 1913. With numerous sketches and plans. Paper approved by order of the Ministry of War (General Staff), No. 11395 of 15 March 1912. Bucharest (Albert Baer), 1914
- The first excursion of military tourists to Brăila-Măcin by Major C. Teodorescu, from the General Staff of the Second Army Corps. Bucharest (Institute of Graphic Arts Carol Gobl Sr I. St. Rasidescu), 1904
- Answer to an article in the Army Magazine by Colonel C. Teodorescu. Bucharest (Institute of Graphic Arts Carol Gobl Sister I. St. Rasidescu), 1912

Reorganization of the Romanian army. Conference held at the Military Circle in Bucharest on 30 March 1905 in the presence of His Majesty the King and officers of all weapons, in the Bucharest garrison, by Major C. Teodorescu, Deputy Chief of Staff of the Second Army Corps, Patented by the General Staff. Bucharest (Carol Gobl Institute of Graphic Arts Sister Ion St. Rasidescu), 1905.

== Bibliography ==
- Kirițescu, Constantin, History of the war for the unification of Romania, Scientific and Encyclopedic Publishing House, Bucharest, 1989
- Ioanițiu, Alexandru, The Romanian War: 1916–1918, vol. 1, Genius Printing House, Bucharest, 1929
  - Romania in the World War 1916–1919, Documents, Annexes, Volume 1, Official Gazette and State Printing, Bucharest, 1934
  - The General Headquarters of the Romanian Army. Documents 1916–1920, Machiavelli Publishing House, Bucharest, 1996
  - Military History of the Romanian People, vol. V, Military Publishing House, Bucharest, 1989
  - Romania during the First World War, Military Publishing House, Bucharest, 1987
  - Romania in the First World War, Military Publishing House, 1979
