= Nova Cherna =

Nova Cherna Нова Черна
- Location of Kranevo
- Coordinates: 44°00′N 26°30′E
- Country: Bulgaria
- Province (Oblast): Silistra
- Municipality (Obshtina): Tutrakan

Government
  - kmet: Nehat Yusmen
- Elevation: 26 m (85 ft)

Population (2009)
  - Total: 1,986
- Time zone: UTC+2 (EET)
  - Summer (DST): UTC+3 (EEST)
- Postal Code: 7645
- Area code: 08634

Nova Cherna (Bulgarian: Нова Черна, historically Romanian: Turcsmil, Turkish: Türk Smil) is a village on the Danube, in northeastern Bulgaria, part of Tutrakan Municipality, Silistra Province. The current name ("New Cherna") is derived from the commune of Cerna in Northern Dobruja, whence its Bulgarian villagers were resettled and replaced by Megleno-Romanians according to the population exchange stipulated by the Treaty of Craiova in 1940. A nature reserve named Kalimok Brashlen is located near the village.

After the fall of the Ottoman power in the Balkans in 1877, the village was included in Bulgaria, but the Treaty of Bucharest (1913) awarded it to Romania. After a brief Bulgarian rule during World War I, it was reverted to Romanian administration by the Treaty of Neuilly, the village finally being retroceded to Bulgaria by the Treaty of Craiova in 1940.

Nearby lies an ancient Roman fortification from Late Antiquity.
