= Staro Selo, Silistra Province =

Staro Selo Старо село
- Location of Staro selo
- Coordinates: 43°58′58″N 26°31′58″E
- Country: Bulgaria
- Province (Oblast): Silistra
- Municipality (Obshtina): Tutrakan

Government
  - Mayor: Angel Angelov
- Elevation: 26 m (85 ft)

Population (2009)
  - Total: 865
- Time zone: UTC+2 (EET)
  - Summer (DST): UTC+3 (EEST)
- Postal Code: 7637
- Area code: 08633

Staro Selo (Bulgarian: Старо село, Romanian: Satu Vechiu) is a village in Silistra Province in northeastern Bulgaria.

== Geography ==
Staro Selo is located in the Danube Valley, 5 km from the Danube, in the valley of the former Old River. Currently the river is dry, but archaeological excavations prove that it ever sailed ships. The village is surrounded on all sides by dense forests. Currently in the old village has no more than 1,000 residents who are engaged in agriculture, animal husbandry and horticulture.
