= Yevgeny Gerngross =

- Евгений Гернгросс
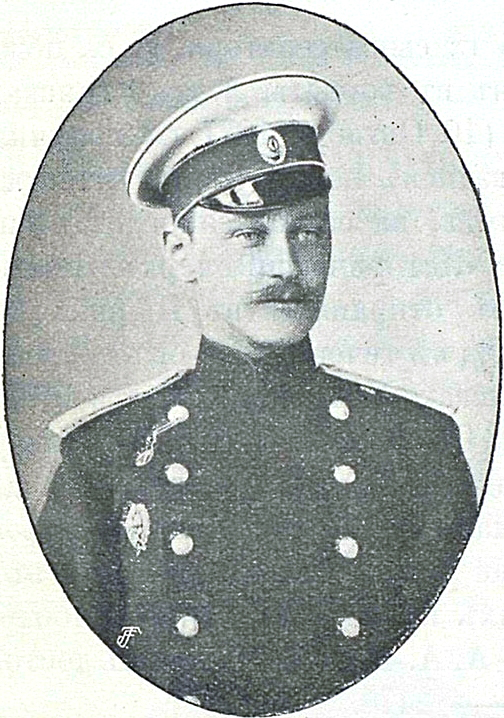

Chief of the Russian General Staff
- In office September 1909 – 22 February 1911
- Monarch: Nicholas II
- Preceded by: Alexander Myshlayevsky
- Succeeded by: Yakov Zhilinsky

Personal details
- Born: 10 February [O.S. 22] 1856 Saint Petersburg, Russian Empire
- Died: 4 May 1912 (aged 57) Saint Petersburg
- Education: Page Corps; Nikolayev General Staff Academy
- Awards: Order of Saint Vladimir; Order of Saint Anna; Order of Saint Stanislaus; Friedrich Order; House and Merit Order of Peter Frederick Louis

Military service
- Allegiance: Russia
- Branch/service: Russian Imperial Army
- Years of service: 1873—1912
- Rank: Lieutenant general

Yevgeny Aleksandrovich Gerngross (Russian: Евгений Александрович Гернгросс; 10 (22) February 1855, Saint Petersburg – 4 (17) May 1912, Saint Petersburg) was Russian military leader, member of His Imperial Majesty's Retinue. He served in various command position including Commander of the Life Guard Horse Regiment (1901-1904). Chief of Staff of the Separate Guards Corps from 1904 to 1907 and as Chief of the General Staff of the Imperial Russian Army from 1909 to 1911.

== Biography ==
Born on February 10 (22), 1855 in St. Petersburg. He came from the nobility of the Saint Petersburg Governorate. Son of the director of the Department of Mining, Lieutenant General Alexander Rodionovich Gerngross.

In 1872, after graduating from the First St. Petersburg Classical Gymnasium with a gold medal, he entered the Page Corps. In 1874, after graduating from the corps with his name inscribed on a marble plaque, he was released as a cornet in the Chevalier Guard Regiment. In 1877 he was promoted to lieutenant of the guard, in 1880 to staff captain of the guard. From 1877 to 1878 and in 1881 he served as head of the regimental training team, from 1883 to 1884 - clerk of the regimental court and from 1884 to 1888 - head of the regimental weapons unit.

In 1881 he graduated from the Nikolayev General Staff Academy with the 1st category. From 1888 to 1892 he commanded the Life Squadron of Her Majesty in the Cavalry Regiment. In 1889 he was promoted to Guards Captain, in 1892 to Guards Colonel. From 1893 to 1895 he was attached to the Minister of War in addition to the staff for assignments regarding the cavalry unit. From 1895 to 1896 he was at the disposal of the Minister of War, General Pyotr Vannovsky. From July 29 to September 2, 1896, he commanded the Crimean Division. From 1896 to 1901, he commanded the 35th Belgorod Dragoon Regiment. In 1900, he was a member of the General Staff commission for the development of the "Charter of Troops in Battle" and the "Instructions for Field Service".

On March 6, 1901, he was promoted to major general and appointed to serve as a general for assignments to the Inspector General of Cavalry, Grand Duke Nikolai Nikolaevich, but on May 25, 1901, he was appointed commander of the Life Guard Horse Regiment. From 1904, he was appointed chief of staff of the 1st Guards Corps. On August 5, 1906, he was promoted to the rank of major general in His Imperial Majesty's Retinue. On January 2, 1907, he was dismissed from the post of Chief of Staff of the Guards Corps and remained in the Retinue. In 1909, he was promoted to the rank of lieutenant general.

=== Chief of the General Staff ===
From September 30, 1909, he was appointed Chief of the General Staff, replacing General Alexander Myshlayevsky in this post. During the period of General Gerngross's leadership of the General Staff, reforms were carried out in it, initiated within the framework of the program of military transformations adopted in August 1908, aimed at improving the military system of Russia. In accordance with the new regulations announced on October 1 (14), 1910 by order of the military department No. 496, the Main Directorate of the General Staff, which by that time had again become part of the General Staff, switched to a new organizational and staff structure. A special committee was created under the Chief of the General Staff to discuss the most important issues related to the combat readiness of the army. The officers of the General Staff serving in the troops were transferred to its jurisdiction. The Imperial Nikolaev Military Academy and the Military Topographical School were subordinated to the Chief of the General Staff.

General Alexander Lukomsky, who served on the General Staff, recalled:

General Myshlaevsky took over the corps and General Gerngross was appointed Chief of the General Staff... he was known as an excellent line commander, an impeccably honest and decent person, but he had never served in any staff since graduating from the academy... In order to get up to speed on all the affairs, he began to work hard, while giving his assistants an independent role, which was why the common cause suffered, not being concentrated in a single set of hands... Due to overwork as a result of hard work, General Gerngross suffered a stroke and General Zhilinsky was appointed Chief of the General Staff in his place

General Gerngross led the General Staff until February 22, 1911, after his dismissal he was listed at the disposal of the Minister of War, General Vladimir Sukhomlinov, and on the lists of the Life Guard Horse Regiment.

He died on May 4 (17), 1912 in St. Petersburg.
