= Bonch-Bruyevich =

Bonch-Bruyevich or Bonch-Bruevich is a double-barreled surname. Its first part indicates the Polish Bończa coat of arms and it is derived from the historical compound Polish family name "Brujewicz of Bończa c.o.a." (Polish: Brujewicz h. Bończa)

Notable people with the surname include:

- Alexey Bonch-Bruyevich (1916-2006), Soviet physicist, expert in quantum electronics and physical optics, recipient of the USSR State Prize (1974), son of Mikhail
- Mikhail Aleksandrovich Bonch-Bruevich (1888-1940), Soviet engineer, pioneer of Soviet radio engineering
- Mikhail Dmitriyevich Bonch-Bruyevich (1870-1956), Imperial Russian and Soviet military commander, brother of Vladimir
- Nikolai Bonch-Bruyevich, Russian architect of Poltava Cadets Corps in 1840
- Vladimir Bonch-Bruyevich (1873-1955), Soviet politician, historian and writer, Old Bolshevik. Author of one of canonical Soviet books about Vladimir Lenin, brother of Mikhail.

== See also ==
- 12657 Bonch-Bruevich, an asteroid named after Alexey Bonch-Bruyevich
