= Nikolay Rattel =

Russian and Soviet military leader

Nikolay Iosifovich Rattel
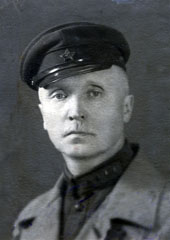
- Nikolay Rattel
- Born: 3 December 1875; Stary Oskol, Russian Empire
- Died: 3 March 1939 (aged 63); Kommunarka shooting ground, Moscow Oblast, Soviet Union
- Burial place: Kommunarka shooting ground 55°34′45″N 37°27′21″E
- Military career
- Allegiance: Russian Empire; Soviet Union
- Unit: General Staff of the Soviet Armed Forces
- Conflicts: Russo-Japanese War; World War I Russian Civil War

Nikolai Iosifovich Rattel (Russian: Николай Иосифович Раттэль; 3 December 1875 – 3 March 1939) was a Russian general, Soviet military leader, a participant in the Russian-Japanese war, First World War and Russian Civil War.

== Biography ==
In 1893 he graduated from Nizhny Novgorod Cadet Corps. In 1896 he studied at the Pavel Military School. He joined the Life Guards Lithuanian Regiment of the Imperial Guard and promoted to lieutenant (seniority since 12 August 1896). Poruchik since 12 August 1900, in 1902 he graduated from the Nikolaev Academy of the General Staff for the first class; The camp gathering was serving in the Warsaw Military District. In 1904 he was a commander in the 122nd Tambov Infantry Regiment.

=== Russo-Japanese war ===
In February–March 1904 he served as the chief officer for office work and assignments in the management of military communications of the Manchurian army. Since 30 March 1904 he was the chief officer for special assignments at the headquarters of the Eastern detachment in the Far East. Since 21 April, was at the disposal of the commander of the Manchurian army.

Since 21 December 1904 he served as a staff officer for assignments with the chief of military communications under the Commander-in-Chief in the Far East. On 17 August 1905 he was promoted to the head of the movement of troops of the main section of the Chinese Eastern Railway. On 2 April 1906 was promoted to Podpolkovnik. Since 3 March 1906 - the head of the movement of troops on the railways and waterways of the Sino-Eastern region. Since 28 October 1907 was at the disposal of the head of the Zamurskaya railway brigade.

From May to September 1908 he served as a commander of the battalion in the 1st Siberian Rifle Regiment. Since 18 September 1911 - the head of the movement of troops of the Kharkov region. On 6 December 1911 was promoted to colonel. From 20 May to 18 September 1912 served at the Artillery School.

=== First World War ===
Since 25 July 1914 he was headquarters officer for office work and instructions of the Chief of Military Communications under the Supreme Commander-in-Chief. Since 1 May 1915 - commander of the 12th Infantry Regiment of the Velikiye Lutsk. In early 1916 he was promoted to Major general. From 2 June 1916 - Quartermaster-General of the headquarters of the Southwestern Front, since 7 August 1917 - quartermaster-general of the headquarters of the Western Front. Since 10 September 1917 - the chief of military reports of the theater of military operations.

=== Civil War ===
In 1918 he joined the Red Army. Since March 1918 - the head of the Supreme Council of the Armed Forces in the Supreme Military Council of the Republic. From July 1918 he was Chief of Staff of the Supreme Military Council. After dismissal due to illness, the chairman of the council, Mikhail Dmitriyevich Bonch-Bruyevich, temporarily served as the chief of staff. From September 1918 he was head of the Field Staff of the Revolutionary Military Council of the Republic and from October 1918 head of the All-Russian Staff.

He participated in planning of the operations of the Eastern, Southern, Western and South-Eastern fronts of the Civil War. He was engaged in the organization of universal military training system and pre-conscription training of workers. He participated in the expansion of the network of Soviet military schools as well as the creation of uniforms for the Red Army. Since 17 June 1920 he was a member of the Special Conference at the Commander in Chief and Chairman of the Military Legislative Council of the Revolutionary Military Council of the Republic. From 15 July 1919 to 7 August 1920 - in the lists of the Headquarters of the Red Army.

In 1919 he supported the initiative of General Davletshin (ru) on the formation of the eastern branch at the Academy of the General Staff of the Red Army. Since 1922 he was at the disposal of the Commander-in-Chief of the Armed Forces of the Republic, then - in the Central Office of Military Communications. From 1923 to March 1924 he worked as the head of the Administrative and Economic Department of the OGPU.

=== Downfall and death ===
In 1925 he was dismissed (reserve RKKA) and went to work in the national economy. He was the manager of a number of economic associations (Glavzoloto, Glavtsvetmetzoloto and others), the head of the technical library "Giprotsvetmetobrabotki." He lived in Moscow (Vorobyevskoye Shosse, 47a, block 1).

On 13 March 1930 he was arrested by the OGPU on charges in connection with an overseas anti-Soviet organization. At the interrogations, he categorically denied any hostile activity against the Soviet authorities, and on 25 May the case against him was terminated. On 28 July 1938 he was again arrested. On 2 March 1939 the Military Collegium of the Supreme Court of the USSR sentenced him to death on the charges of participation in a counter-revolutionary terrorist organization. He was shot on 3 March 1939 and is buried at Kommunarka shooting ground. He was posthumously rehabilitated on 10 November 1956.

Military offices
Preceded by Office established	Chiefs of the Field Staff of the Revolutionary Military Council of the Republic; 6 September 1918 – 21 October 1918	Succeeded by Fyodor Kostyayev
