= Mikhail Bonch-Bruyevich =

Mikhail Bonch-Bruyevich may refer to:

- Mikhail Bonch-Bruyevich (commander) (Mikhail Dmitriyevich Bonch-Bruyevich, 1777–1861), Russian military commander
- Mikhail Bonch-Bruyevich (engineer) (Mikhail Aleksandrovich Bonch-Bruevich, 1888–1940), Russian engineer, scientist, and professor
