= Vladimir Marushevsky =

Russian general (1874–1951)

- Владимир Марушевский
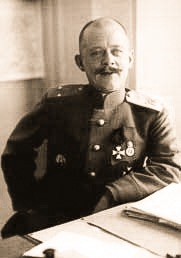

Chief of the General Staff
- In office 26 September 1917 – 23 November 1917
- President: Alexander Kerensky
- Preceded by: Ivan Romanovsky
- Succeeded by: Nikolay Potapov (as the chief of staff of the Red Army)

Personal details
- Born: 12 July 1874 Peterhof, Saint Petersburg, Russian Empire
- Died: 24 November 1951 (aged 77) Zagreb, Socialist Republic of Croatia, SFR Yugoslavia
- Awards: See below

Military service
- Allegiance: Russian Empire; Russian Republic; White Movement
- Branch/service: Imperial Russian Army; Russian Army; White Army
- Years of service: 1896–1919
- Rank: Lieutenant general
- Battles/wars: Russo-Japanese War; World War I; Russian Civil War

Vladimir Vladimirovich Marushevsky (Russian: Влади́мир Влади́мирович Маруше́вский; 12 July 1874 – 24 November 1951) was a Russian military leader who was a general in the Imperial Russian Army and the White Army. He also served as the last chief of staff of the short-lived Russian Republic.

== Biography ==
=== Early life ===
Marushevsky was born on 12 July 1874, in Saint Petersburg, to a noble family originated from the Saint Petersburg Governorate. In 1893 and 1896, he graduated from the Sixth Cadet Corps and the Nikolaev Engineering School, respectively. After graduating, he served in several minor battalions. During this time, he was promoted to lieutenant in 1898, and staff captain in 1902. He was deployed during the 1904–05 Russo-Japanese War.

== World War I ==
In the First World War, he commanded the 3rd Special Infantry Brigade of the Russian Expeditionary Force in France between July 1916 and May 1917. Between 26 September and 23 November 1917, he was the last Chief of the General Staff of the Russian Empire. He was briefly arrested in November 1917, by order of the Council of People's Commissars on charges of negotiations against the Soviet government (the same charge was brought against Nikolay Dukhonin, who was killed by soldiers at Stavka), and the sabotage of the armistice with Germany. Together with General Alexey Manikovsky (who carried out the technical management of the military department) Marushevsky was arrested and sent to Kresty Prison. On 1 December 1917, he was released on parole, after which he fled to Finland and Sweden.

== Russian Civil War ==
On 19 November 1918, at the invitation of the British and French military missions, he came to Arkhangelsk, where he was appointed Commander of the Northern Region. At the same time, he was a member of the Provisional Government of the Northern Region as Governor-General and the head of the departments of internal affairs, communications, posts, and telegraphs. He led the formation of the “White” Northern Army of about 20,000 soldiers. It relied heavily on the British military contingent, which took part in the North Russia intervention and led military operations against units of the Red Army. On 13 January 1919, he transferred the duties of the Governor-General to General Yevgeny Miller, remaining commander of the Army (but actually serving as Miller's assistant).

From May 1919, he was Lieutenant General. In the summer of 1919, he negotiated with Mannerheim about military cooperation between Finland and the Russian Northern Region. On 19 August 1919, he resigned from the post of commander of the Northern Army and on 5 September 1919, he went to Sweden.

He went into exile in Yugoslavia, and died in Zagreb in 1951.
