= Bykhov Imprisonment =

The Bykhov Imprisonment, the Bykhov Arrest of the Generals, the Bykhov Capture of the Generals were events related to the arrest and detention by the authorities of the Provisional Government of a part of the generals and officers of the Russian Army for participation and support of the Kornilov's Uprising. These persons were kept from September 11 to November 19, 1917, in the prison of the city of Bykhov, Mogilyov Guberniya.

== Arrest ==
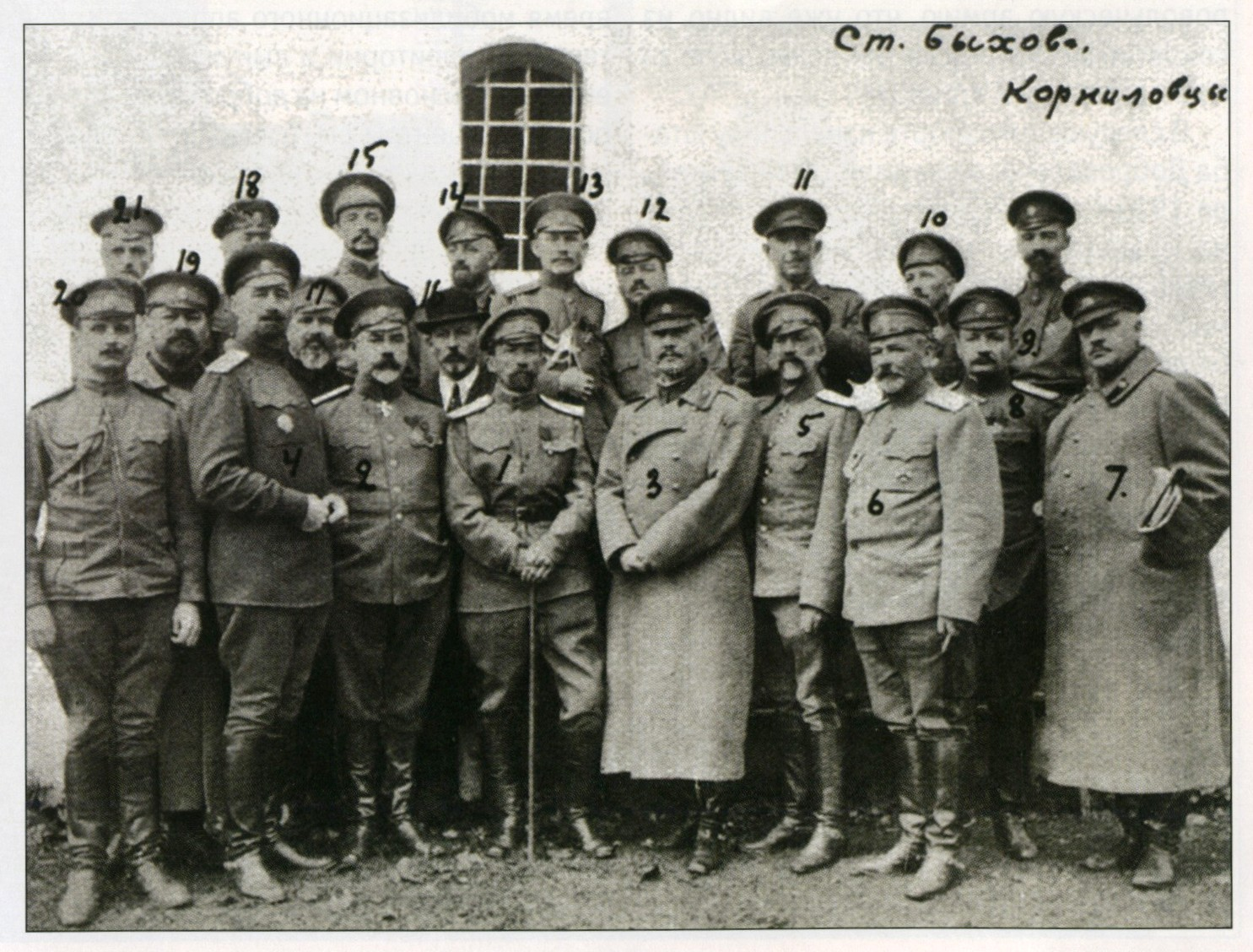
A group of arrested generals and officers led by Kornilov during the Bykhov Imprisonment. By numbers: 1. Lavr Kornilov; 2. Anton Denikin; 3. Gleb Vannovskiy; 4. Ivan Erdeli; 5. Evgeniy Elsner; 6. Aleksandr Lukomskiy; 7. Vasiliy Kislyakov; 8. Ivan Romanovskiy; 9. Sergey Markov; 10. Mikhail Orlov; 11. Aleksey Aladin; 12. Aleksandr Bragin; 13. Vasiliy Pronin; 14. Warrant Officer Sergey Nikitin; 15. Warrant Officer Aleksandr Ivanov; 16. Iosaf Nikanorov (Nikonorov); 17. Leonid Novosiltsev; 18. Georgiy Chunikhin; 19. Ivan Rodionov; 20. Ivan Soots; 21. Voytekh Kletsanda. Autumn 1917

In the summer of 1917, the situation in the country, especially taking into account the July Bolshevik Uprising, continued to be revolutionary. The Head of the Provisional Government, Aleksandr Kerenskiy, at the end of August assured the Supreme Commander–in–Chief of the Russian Army, Lavr Kornilov, that he agreed with all his proposals to establish strict order in the country and the army. Kornilov gave the order for units to attack Petrograd. At the same time, on August 27, special editions of newspapers called Kornilov a "state traitor". On the same day, Kerenskiy in a telegram demanded that Kornilov voluntarily resign from office, and on August 29 he ordered the dismissal from office and trial "for rebellion against the Provisional Government" of General Kornilov and his senior associates. On September 1, Kornilov was arrested by General Mikhail Alekseev, who took the position of Chief of Staff of the Supreme Commander–in–Chief under the self–appointed Supreme Commander–in–Chief Kerenskiy only to save Kornilov and his employees, and after interrogation by the investigative commission, on the morning of September 11 he was brought under escort to Stary Bykhov, which is 50 km away from Mogilyov. General Kornilov, and with him three dozen other military and civilian officials – "accomplices" – were imprisoned in a local prison, a two–story gloomy building of a former Catholic monastery.

On August 27, the day of the announcement of Kerenskiy's demand for Kornilov to resign as Supreme Commander–in–Chief, the commander of the Southwestern Front, General Anton Denikin, expressed distrust in the actions of the Provisional Government in his telegram, supporting General Kornilov. At the same time, the Chief of Staff of the Southwestern Front, General Sergey Markov, sent a telegram to the government supporting Denikin's opinion.

The Provisional Government responded to these actions by arresting the entire Senior Command Staff of the Southwestern Front, led by Denikin and Markov, and imprisoning them in Berdichev Prison. The arrest was made on August 29 by the Commissioner of the Southwestern Front, Nikolay Iordanskiy. On September 27, the prisoners were transported from Berdichev to the Bykhov Prison, almost becoming victims of lynching by the revolutionary crowd during their transfer to the station in Berdichev. The reprisal did not occur, according to Anton Denikin, only thanks to the decisive actions of staff captain Viktor Betling.

On August 28, the Provisional Government established an "Extraordinary Commission to Investigate the Case of the Former Supreme Commander–in–Chief General Lavr Kornilov and His Accomplices". Naval prosecutor Iosif Shablovskiy was appointed Chairman of the Commission, and military lawyers Colonels Nikolay Ukraintsev and Roman fon Raupakh, and judicial investigator Nikolay Kolokolov were members. Despite pressure from Kerenskiy, the commission had an unbiased attitude towards the accused, which soon turned into sympathy. At the initiative of the commission members, in September 1917, a telegraph tape of negotiations between Kerenskiy and Kornilov was published, presenting Kornilov in a favorable light in the eyes of the public.

Gallery

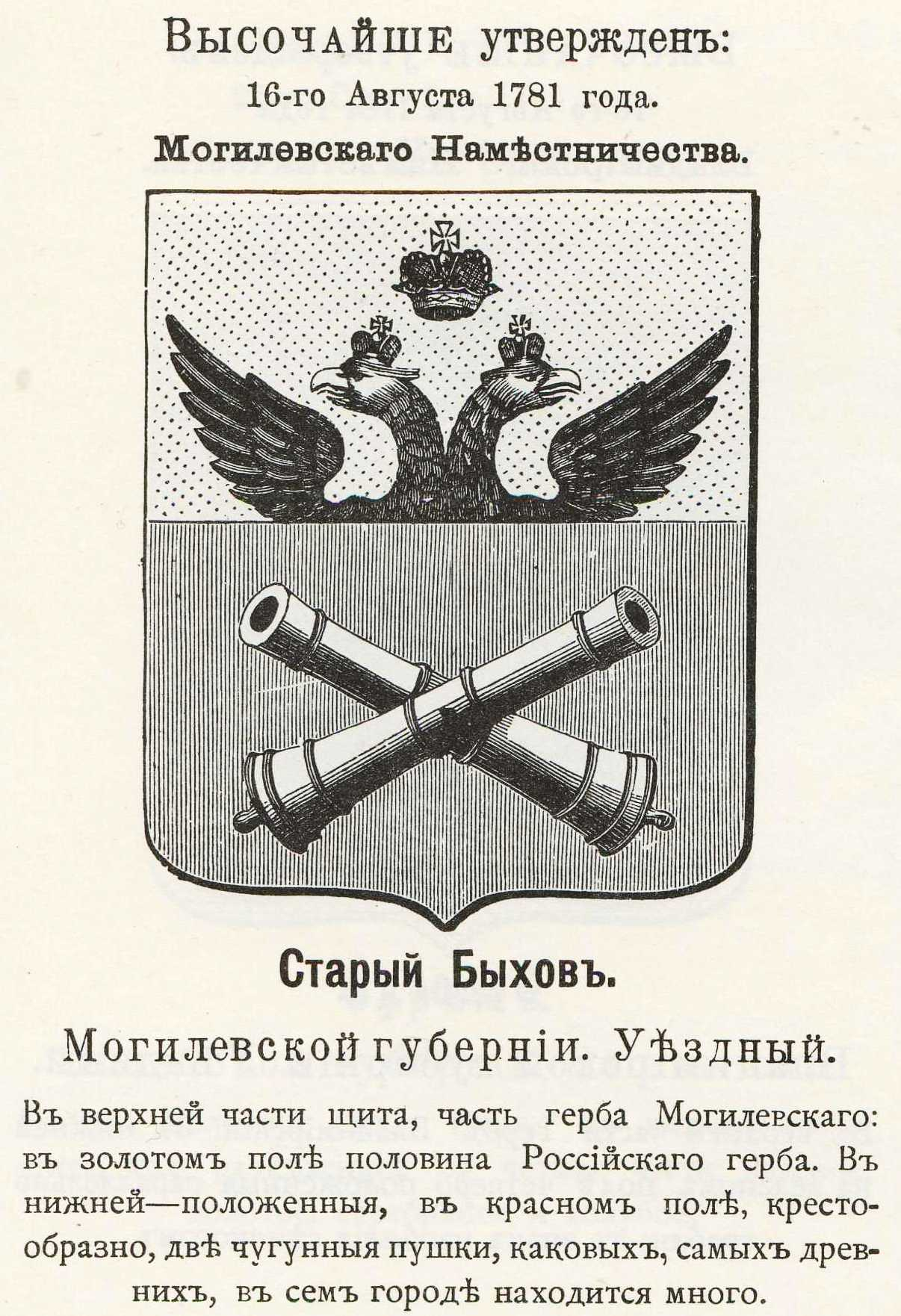
Russian Military Coat of Arms of Bykhov – two crossed cannons (1781)

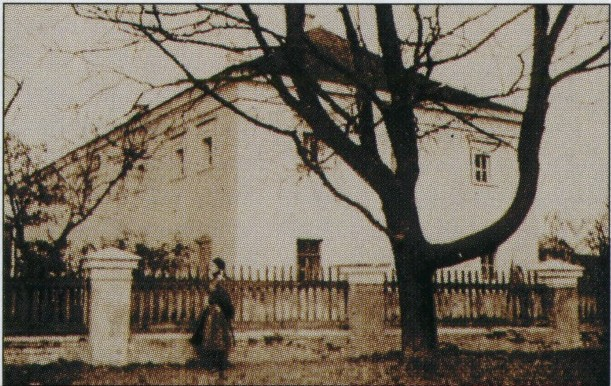
Bykhov Prison. The building of the former women's gymnasium

== Composition of prisoners ==
=== Arrested with Kornilov ===
- Lavr Kornilov, Infantry General, Supreme Commander–in–Chief of the Russian Army;
- Aleksandr Lukomskiy, Lieutenant General, Chief of Staff of Kornilov;
- Ivan Romanovskiy, Lieutenant General;
- Yuriy Plyushchevskiy–Plyushchik, Lieutenant General (released early);
- Nikolay Tikhmenev, Lieutenant General (released early);
- Vasiliy Kislyakov, General;
- Aleksandr Bragin, Captain, Head of the Stavka Printing House;
- Aleksey Aladin, former member of the State Duma, private person.

=== Berdichev Group of arrested generals ===
A group of generals of the Southwestern Front who were held in the Berdichev Prison and were later transferred to the Bykhov Prison:

- Anton Denikin, Lieutenant General, Front Commander;
- Sergey Markov, Lieutenant General, Chief of Staff of Denikin;
- Ivan Erdeli, Cavalry General, Commander of the Special Army;
- Gleb Vannovskiy, Lieutenant General, Commander of the 1st Army;
- Vladimir Selivachyov, Lieutenant General, Commander of the 7th Army;
- Mikhail Orlov, Quartermaster General of the Front Headquarters;
- Evgeniy Elsner, Lieutenant General, Chief of Supply of the Southwestern Front;
- Ivan Pavskiy, Lieutenant General (arrested by accident);
- Dmitriy Sergievskiy, Major General (arrested by accident).

Besides:

- Prince Krapotkin, Staff Captain, Commandant of the Commander–in–Chief's Train;
- Voytekh Kletsanda, Lieutenant of the Czech Troops (arrested for wounding a soldier on August 28).

=== Members of the Main Committee of the Union of Army and Navy Officers ===
- Leonid Novosiltsev – Chairman of the Main Committee of the Union of Army and Navy Officers, one of the organizers of the Kornilov's Uprising;
- Lieutenant Colonel Vasiliy Pronin – Comrade of the Chairman of the Main Committee;
- Lieutenant Colonel Ivan Soots – Member of the Main Committee;
- Lieutenant Colonel Ivan Grintsevich – Member of the Main Committee;
- Esaul Ivan Rodionov – Member of the Main Committee;
- Captain Vladimir Rozhenko – Secretary of the Main Committee;
- Captain Sergey Ryasnyanskiy – Member of the Main Committee;
- Staff Captain N. H. Andersen – Member of the Main Committee;
- Staff Captain Georgiy Chunikhin – Member of the Main Committee;
- Ensign Sergey Nikitin – Member of the Main Committee;
- Ensign Aleksandr Ivanov – Secretary of the Main Committee.

== Imprisonment ==
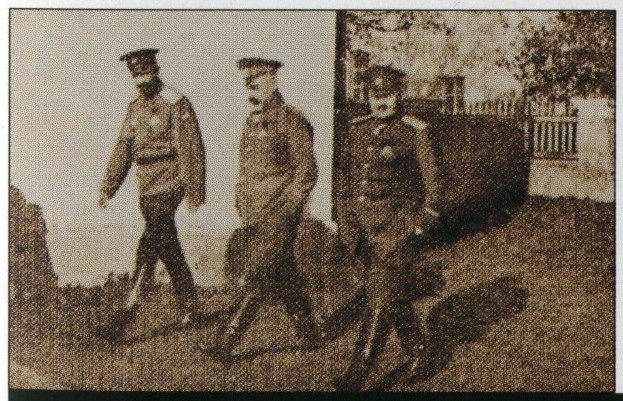
In Bykhov Prison. On a walk. From left to right: Lieutenant General Sergey Markov, Lieutenant General Anton Denikin, Lieutenant General Ivan Romanovskiy

General Dukhonin, who gave the order for the release of Bykhov Prisoners on November 19, 1917

The former Supreme Commander–in–Chief, as well as his associates, were saved from soldier lynching by the devotion to Kornilov of the Tekin Cavalry Regiment guarding the prison and the reliability of the thick stone walls of the prison itself.

A prisoner of the Bykhov Prison, General Aleksandr Lukomskiy, provides the following information about the situation of prisoners:

Officially, we had to sit in our rooms all the time, except for the time needed for food and the time provided for walking, but in reality inside the building we enjoyed complete freedom and walked whenever we wanted, one to another. We were deprived of our monetary allowance, but we were allowed to prepare food at government expense, the same as was given at officer meetings. A cook was sent from Headquarters to Bykhov, and we were fed quite satisfactorily... We were allowed to walk twice a day in the courtyard, around the church. Subsequently, a large garden adjacent to the house in which we were accommodated was set aside for our walks.

Some everyday details of the Bykhov Imprisonment are given by General Lavr Kornilov's adjutant, Lieutenant Rezak Khadzhiev. Without being convicted, he, as Kornilov's adjutant, had unhindered entry into the prison, carrying out various assignments for prisoners (such as sending personal letters):

People, living in the same position, all together, under one roof, equally feeling the bitterness of resentment, the injustice of fate, feeling loneliness, the every–minute danger hanging over them, the bitter experience of the soul, and most importantly, accustomed to seeing each other hourly, every minute, began to lose that mutual respect with which they entered Bykhov.
Mutual gossip began; when meeting with the generals, the younger ones did not seem to notice them and did not show much respect for them. (…)
The only one for whom everyone had the same feelings was the Supreme.
They loved him, respected him, believed and hoped for him, having boundless devotion to him. (…) When he appeared, everyone (…) sitting and lying jumped up and waited with bated breath for what the Supreme One would say. Not a whisper, not a sigh, arms outstretched at the sides, a silent command "at attention".

In the evenings, the inmates gathered in the most spacious of the cells, Cell No. 6, to discuss the latest news or listen to someone's report on a political or historical topic. Close friends – generals Denikin, Romanovskiy and Markov – could talk in their cell until late at night.

"Prison won't last forever", General Denikin wrote to his 25-year–old fiancée Kseniya Chizh. The Bykhov Inmates were aware of the rapidly changing political situation outside the prison walls, which promised imminent release. The generals outlined new paths for the struggle, which must necessarily be continued.

Sergey Karpenko, a historian and researcher of the Civil War, describes the aspirations of the arrested generals:

All conversations boiled down to "the most distressing and painful thing" – about the outbreak of "Russian Troubles and ways to end it". No one doubted: the struggle would continue. After all, the very course of events leaves them no other choice: economic devastation is intensifying, the Germans are threatening the capital, fraternization with the enemy has accelerated the disintegration of the army, the Bolsheviks are behaving more and more insolently, and Kerenskiy, with his chatter, laxity and double–dealing, is clearing the way for Lenin to power.

As a result of the inmates' search for answers to the pressing issues of Russian modern life and the turmoil, a small commission with the participation of Denikin developed a "strictly business–like program for keeping the country from a final fall", approved by Kornilov without wasting time on its discussion. According to Sergey Karpenko, this program turned out to be "dotted and unclear": due to the generals' vague ideas about the economic measures that need to be taken to create an "organized rear". The generals hoped to entrust the development and implementation of these measures to the "public" and "specialists", but Sergey Karpenko states here that Kornilov and the generals who joined him "did not benefit from one of the most bitter reproaches of the August Failure": the failure of all attempts to guarantee the involvement of government public figures, officials and representatives of financial and industrial circles after the establishment of "firm power".

== Liberation and escape ==
On November 7, 1917, the Bolsheviks took power in Petrograd. The Chairman of the Investigative Commission in the Kornilov Case, Iosif Shablovskiy, based on the investigation data, by December 1, released all those arrested except five (Kornilov, Lukomskiy, Romanovskiy, Denikin and Markov). According to other sources, after the October Coup, the chairman of the commission, Iosif Shablovskiy, was forced to go into hiding, and his place was taken by Colonel Roman fon Raupakh, who took the initiative to release the arrested.

On December 2, the Acting Supreme Commander–in–Chief of the Russian Army, Nikolay Dukhonin, gave an order (which turned out to be his last) to release the generals arrested in connection with the Kornilov's Uprising in August 1917. To carry out the order, he sent Colonel Pavel Kusonskiy to Bykhov. On the evening of December 2, all the arrested generals and officers left Bykhov. On December 3, Supreme Commander–in–Chief Nikolay Krylenko, appointed by the Soviet authorities, arrested Dukhonin. On the same day, Dukhonin, who was under arrest in Krylenko's Carriage, was killed by revolutionary sailors at the Mogilyov Station. Generals Denikin, Markov, Lukomskiy and Romanovskiy, by different routes, a few days later ended up on the Don in the area where the Volunteer Army was formed. General Kornilov, who left Bykhov at the head of a detachment with a personal convoy of Tekes, breaking through with battles, reached the Don a few days later with great difficulties, disbanding the convoy along the road.

== In the Volunteer Army ==
Most of the Bykhov Prisoners became the founders of the Volunteer Army, forming the core of its command staff. According to the memoirs of Pyotr Makhrov, General Kelchevskiy used the catchphrase about the command staff of Denikin's Army that it was divided into "princes" (Bykhov Prisoners), "dukes" (Pioneers) and "others". Makhrov himself, however, did not agree with this assessment, believing that Denikin, when making appointments to positions, did not allow protectionism and was guided only by the merits of this or that person.

== Bykhov Album ==
Sergey Ryasnyanskiy asked his fellow prisoners to write a few lines as a souvenir in a notebook he had. Everyone agreed, and as a result he created an autograph album, which Ryasnyanskiy managed to save. The album was published by the Bronze Horseman Publishing House in the Collection "White Deed" in 1927.

Some pages from Bykhov Album

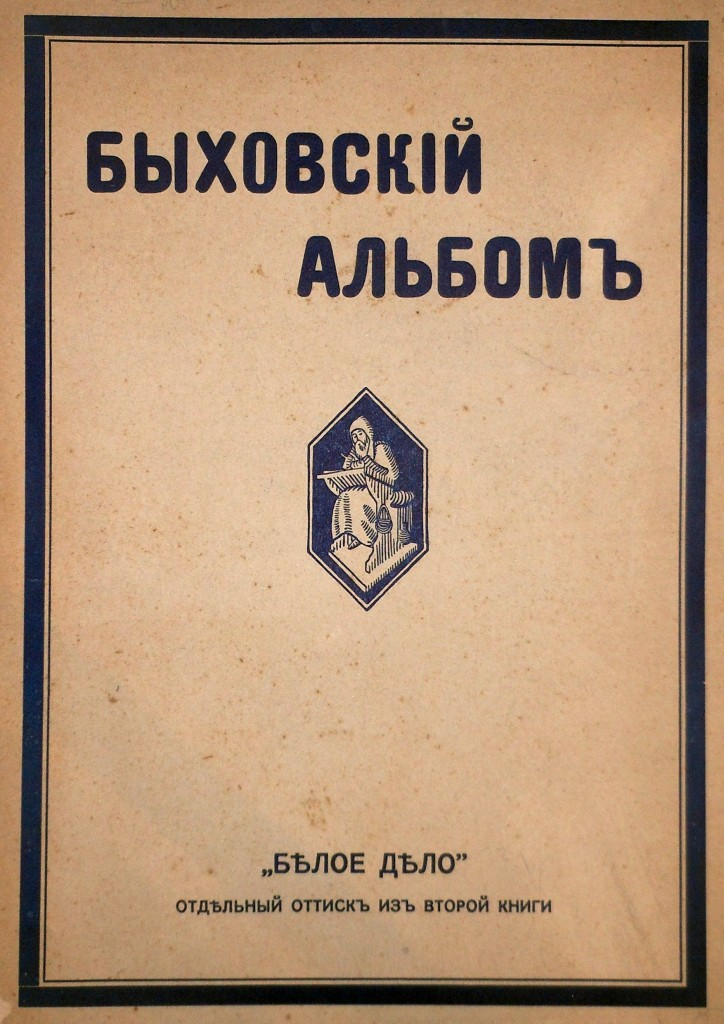

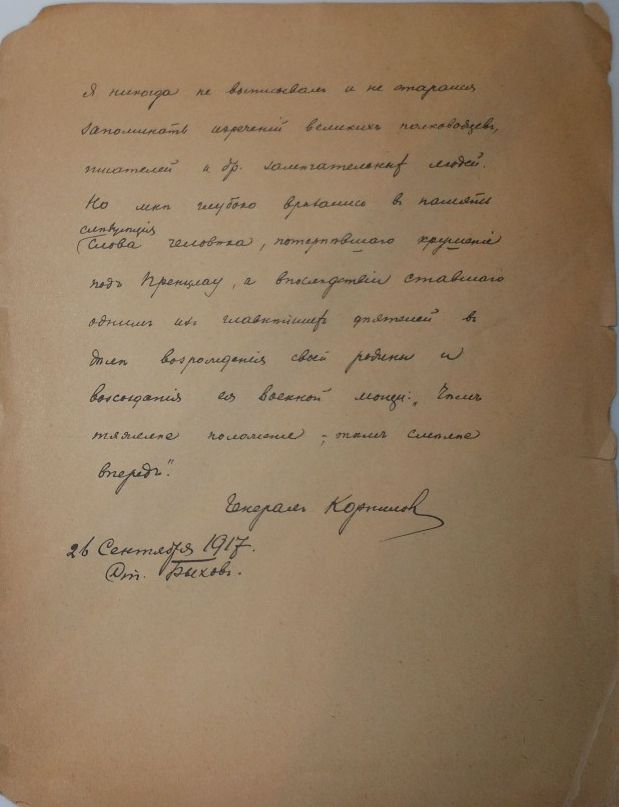

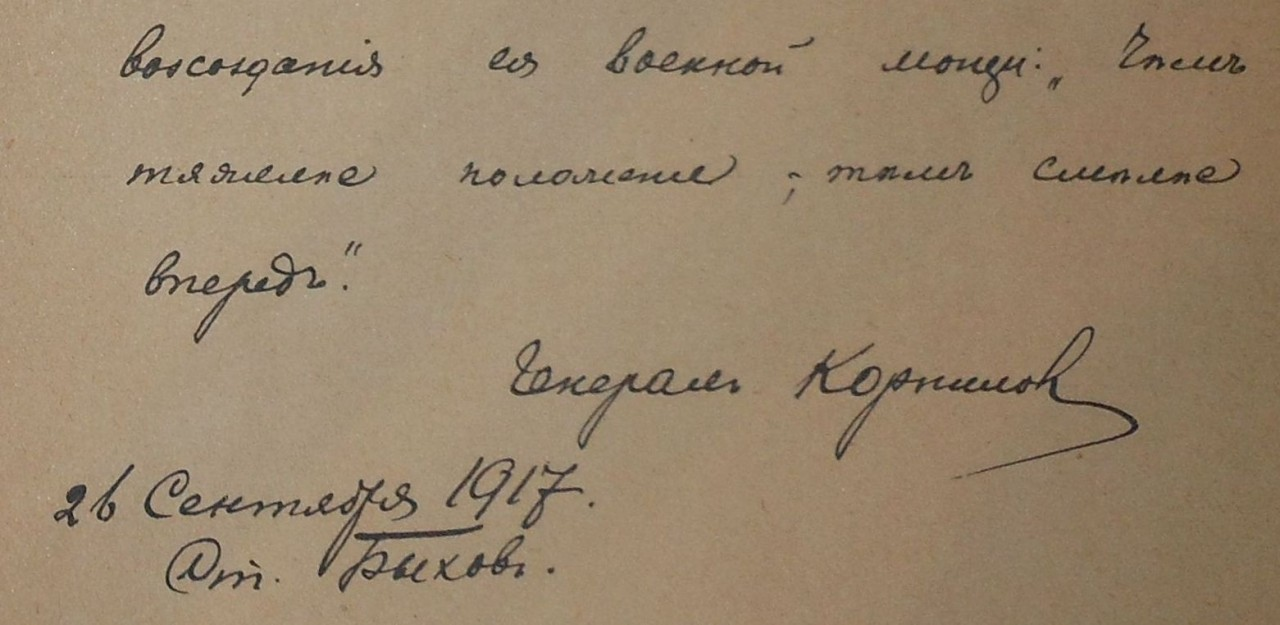

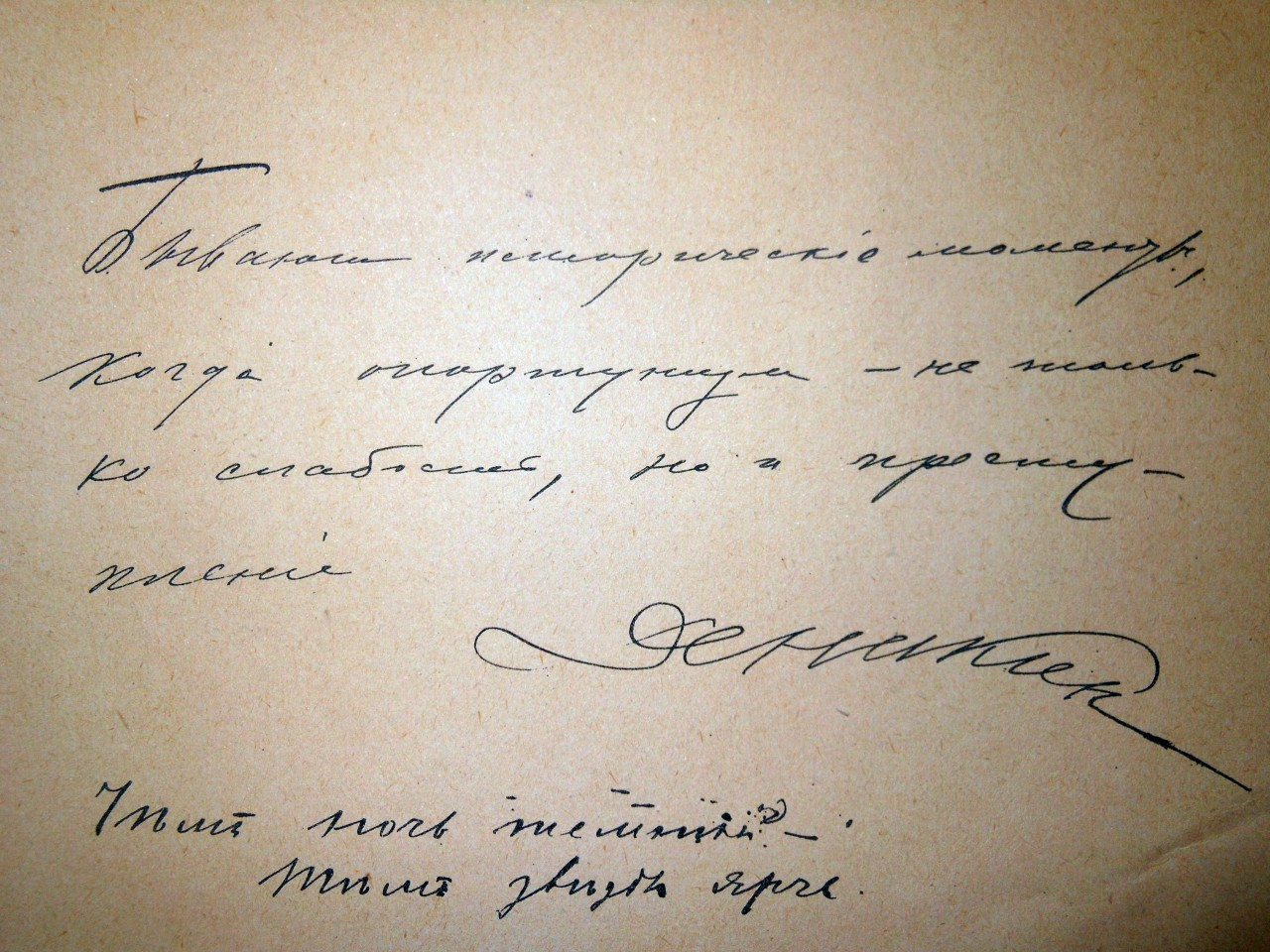

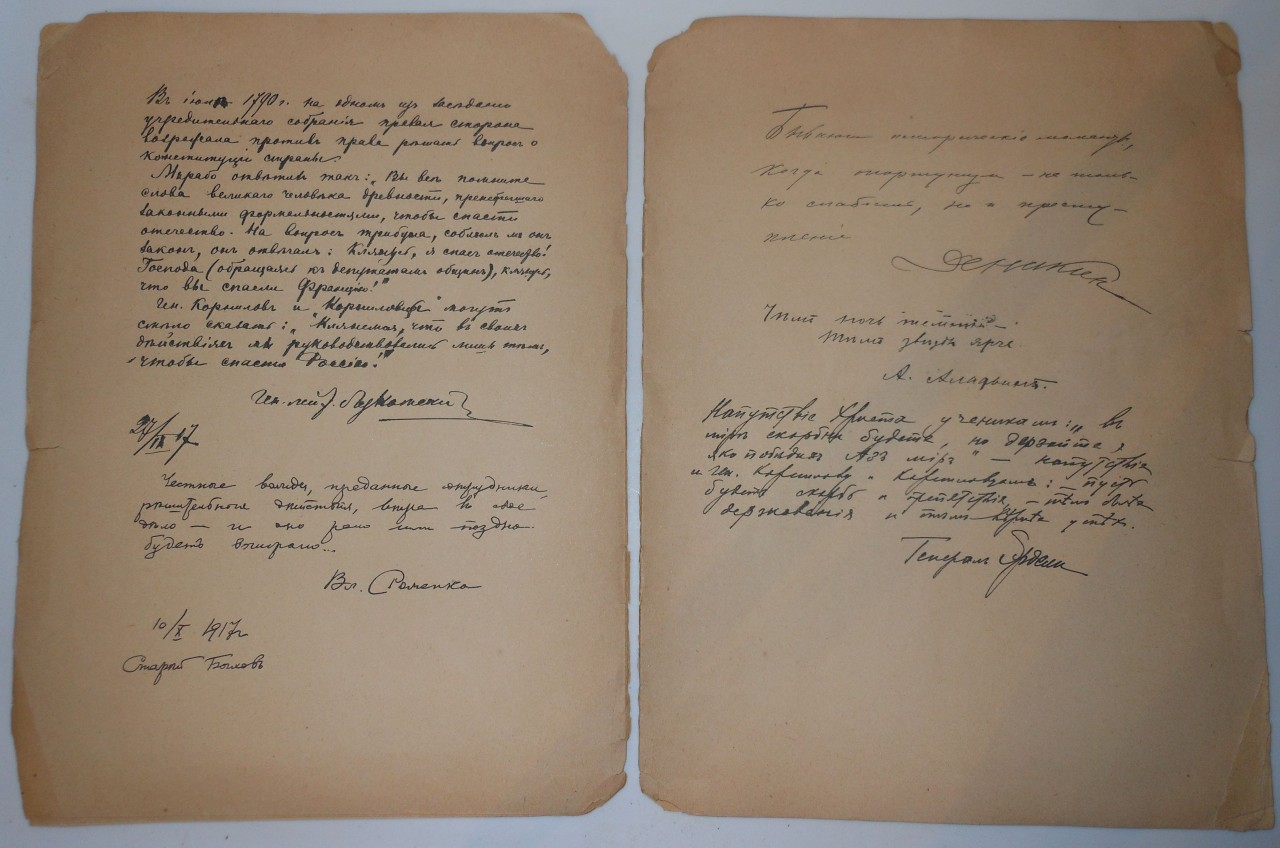

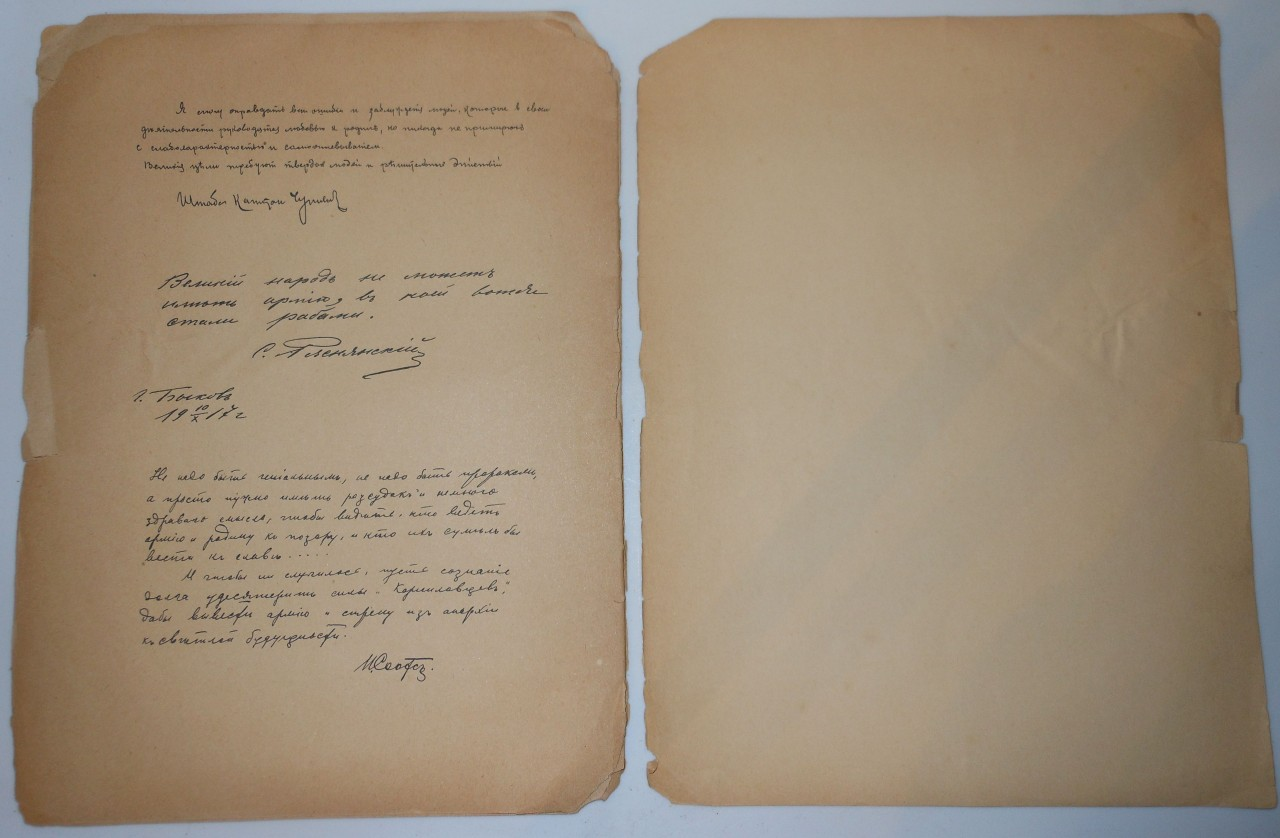

== Screening of events ==
- Events related to the circumstances of the arrest of the generals in Berdichev, the period of their stay in the Bykhov Prison and escape, as well as the death of General Dukhonin, were artistically reflected in the 8th Episode of the film "Death of the Empire", which is called "The Officer's Prayer".
- Soviet television film "December 20" (1981) about the creation of the Extraordinary Commission: the episode with the release of the five and the death of the convoy from the regimental committee.

== Sources ==
- The White Cause. Book 2. Berlin, 1927
- Bykhov Album. A Separate Reprint From Book 2 of "The White Case"
