= Pyotr Frolov (general) =

- Пётр Фролов
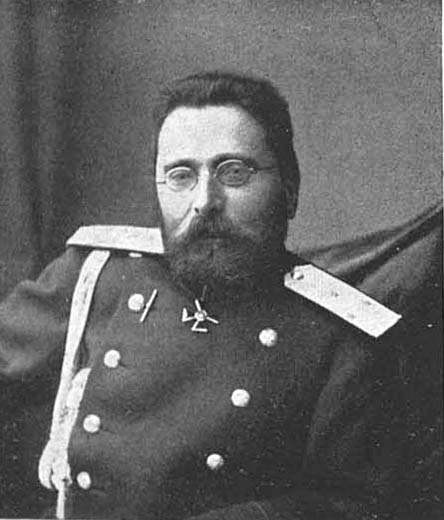

Chief of the Russian General Staff
- In office 11 March 1904 – 28 June 1905
- Monarch: Nicholas II
- Preceded by: Viktor Sakharov
- Succeeded by: Fyodor Palitzin

Personal details
- Born: 1852
- Died: Unknown
- Education: Nikolayev General Staff Academy

Military service
- Allegiance: Russia
- Branch/service: Russian Imperial Army
- Rank: General of the Infantry
- Battles/wars: World War I Russian Civil War

Pyotr Aleksandrovich Frolov (Russian: Пётр Александрович Фролов; 1852 — not earlier than 1918) was an infantry general, member of the State Council and Military Council who served as Chief of the General Staff of the Imperial Russian Army

== Biography ==
The son of the Decembrist Aleksandr Filippovich Frolov, he was born on October 4, 1852, in the Yeniseysk Governorate, where his father was serving his exile. On August 8, 1868, he was enrolled in the 3rd Aleksandrovsky Military School, from which he graduated on July 21, 1870, as a second lieutenant in the 51st Lithuanian Infantry Regiment.

On March 6, 1872, he was transferred as an ensign to the Kerch Fortress Artillery, where on November 6 of the same year he was promoted to second lieutenant, and on December 29 of the following year — to lieutenant.

In 1875, he entered the Nikolayev General Staff Academy, and on December 9, 1876, he received the rank of staff captain. Upon completion of the course in 1878, for excellent academic performance, he was promoted to captain on January 6 and on May 5 he was appointed to the headquarters of the 1st Infantry Division, which was part of the Army Operating in Bulgaria; he crossed the Balkans, arrived at the division, received the post of senior adjutant at the headquarters and was within Turkey until the beginning of 1879: in Razgrad, Pravody, Varna and Demotika; in March 1879 he returned to Russia by sea from Burgas.

Upon his return, he successively held the posts of senior adjutant of the 1st Grenadier Division (from March 23, 1879) and staff officer for assignments at the headquarters of the troops of the Moscow Military District (March 22, 1880); on April 12, 1881, he was promoted to lieutenant colonel and on April 8, 1884, to colonel. In 1886 he was seconded to the 3rd Pernovsky Grenadier Regiment, where he commanded a battalion for a year.

On April 2, 1888, he was transferred to the General Staff as one of the staff officers of the General Staff, and on January 5, 1890, he received the position of department chief. On January 26, 1893, he was appointed district duty general of the Kyiv Military District headquarters. The following year, on March 2, he was promoted to major general for distinguished service (with seniority from August 30), and on January 31, 1898, he returned to service at the General Staff, receiving the position of assistant chief of the General Staff. On January 1, 1901, he was promoted to lieutenant general (with seniority from December 6, 1900) and from May 1, 1903, he held the position of duty general.

During his service at the General Staff, he carried out various assignments, participated in the work of a special commission to develop a charter on zemstvo duties, and from March 11, 1903, temporarily held the position of Chief of the General Staff. On June 28, 1905, he was appointed a member of the Military Council.

At the end of the Russo-Japanese War, he was the chairman of the Central Administrative Committee for the evacuation of Russian prisoners from Japan. On December 6, 1907, he was promoted to General of the Infantry.

During World War I, Frolov held the position of Chief of the Petrograd Military District from September 5 to September 14, 1915, then was the Chief of Supply for the Armies of the Northern Front, and from April 2, 1916, he was an assistant to the Minister of War, and was also a member of the Main Military Court. On January 13, 1917, he was appointed a member of the State Council, while retaining the position of Assistant to the Minister of War and a member of the Military Council. From May 9, 1917, he was again the chief of supply for the armies of the Northern Front, and on December 12, he returned to work in the Military Council.

On March 21, 1918, in connection with the abolition of all institutions of the former Russian Empire, Frolov was dismissed. His further fate is unclear.
