= Chief of the General Staff (Russia) =

Highest ranking officer of the Russian Armed Forces

- Начальник Генерального штаба (Russian)
- Emblem of the general staff

- Ensign of the Chief of the General Staff

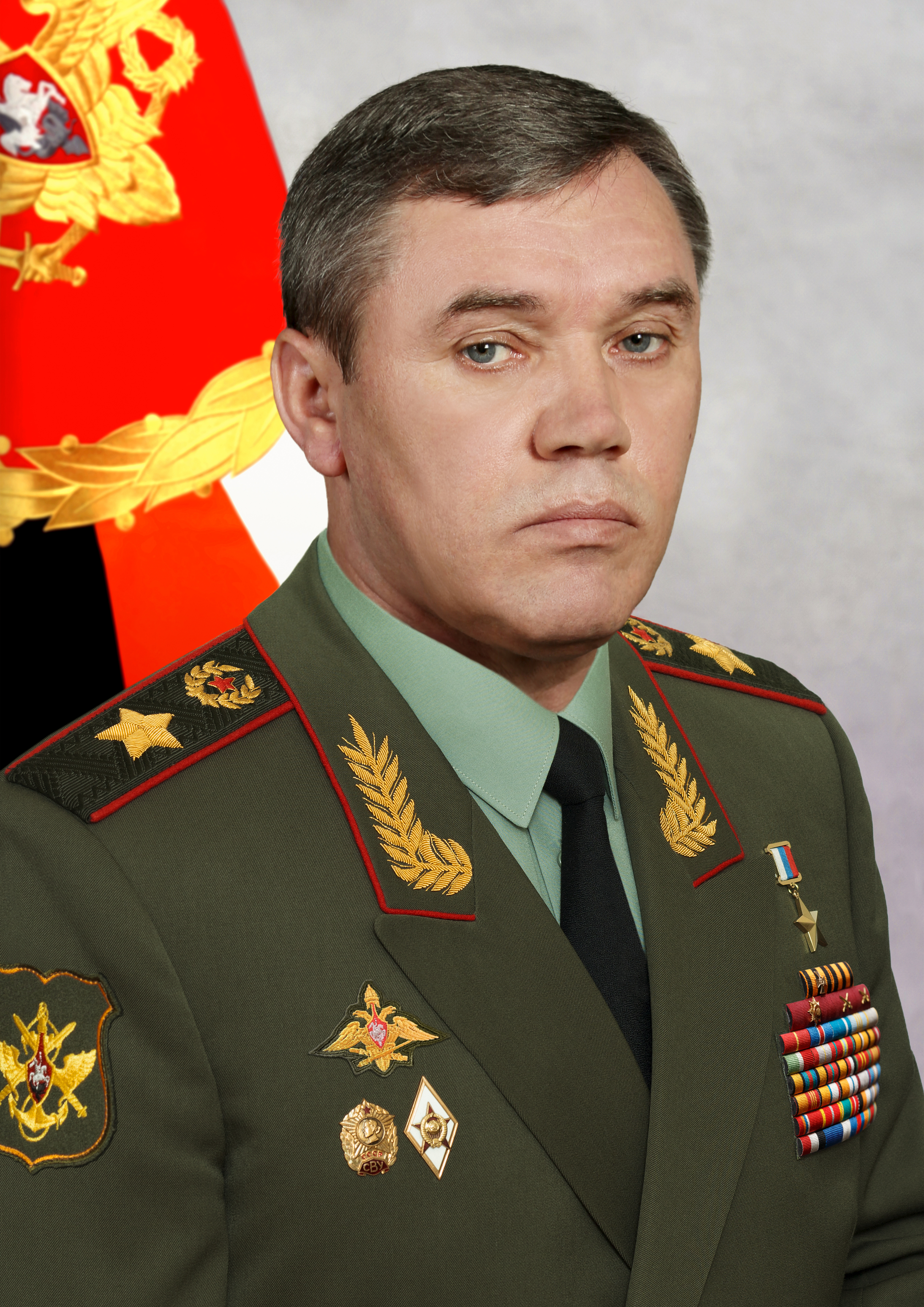
- Incumbent; Army General Valery Gerasimov since 9 November 2012
- General Staff of the Armed Forces
- Type: Chief of staff
- Member of: General Staff; Security Council
- Reports to: Minister of Defence of Russia; President of Russia (sometimes)
- Seat: General Staff Building, Znamenka 14/1, Moscow
- Appointer: President of Russia
- Formation: 9 August 1812 (historical); 10 June 1992 (current)
- First holder: General-Adjutant Pavel Gavrilovich Gagarin
- Deputy: First Deputy Chief of the General Staff
- Website: www.mil.ru

The Chief of the General Staff (Russian: Начальник Генерального штаба) is the head of the General Staff and the highest ranking officer of the Russian Armed Forces or is also the senior-most uniformed military officer. He is appointed by the President of Russia, who is the Supreme Commander-in-Chief. The position dates to the period of the Russian Empire. The current Chief of the General Staff is Army General Valery Gerasimov.

== List of chiefs of the general staff ==
† denotes people who died in office.

=== Imperial Russian Army (1812–1917) ===
==== Director of the Inspection Department of the Ministry of War ====
| No. | Portrait | Director of the Inspection Department of the Ministry of War | Took office | Left office | Time in office | Defence branch |
|---|---|---|---|---|---|---|
| 1 | Pavel Gavrilovich Gagarin [ru] | General-Adjutant; Pavel Gavrilovich Gagarin (1777–1850) | 9 August 1812 | 13 December 1814 | 2 years, 126 days | Imperial Russian Army |
| 2 | Andrey Kleinmikhel [ru] | Lieutenant General; Andrey Kleinmikhel (1757–1815) | 13 December 1814 | 25 June 1815 | 194 days | Imperial Russian Army |

==== Chief of the Main Staff ====
| No. | Portrait | Chief of the Main Staff | Took office | Left office | Time in office | Defence branch |
|---|---|---|---|---|---|---|
| 1 | Pyotr Volkonsky | Lieutenant General; Pyotr Volkonsky (1776–1852) | 1810 | 1823 | 13 years, 0 days | Imperial Russian Army |
| 2 | Hans Karl von Diebitsch | Lieutenant General; Hans Karl von Diebitsch (1785–1831) | 1823 | 1828 | 5 years, 0 days | Imperial Russian Army |
| 3 | Alexander Chernyshyov | Lieutenant General; Alexander Chernyshyov (1785–1857) | 1828 | 1832 | 4 years, 0 days | Imperial Russian Army |
| 4 | Fyodor Logginovich van Heiden | Lieutenant General; Fyodor Logginovich van Heiden (1821–1900) | 1 January 1866 | 22 May 1881 | 15 years, 141 days | Imperial Russian Army |
| 5 | Nikolai Obruchev | Lieutenant General; General of the Infantry; Nikolai Obruchev (1830–1904) | 10 June 1881 | 31 December 1897 | 16 years, 204 days | Imperial Russian Army |
| 6 | Viktor Sakharov | Lieutenant General; Viktor Sakharov (1848–1905) | 20 January 1898 | 11 March 1904 | 6 years, 51 days | Imperial Russian Army |
| 7 | Pyotr Frolov | Lieutenant General; Pyotr Frolov (1852–?) | 11 March 1904 | 28 June 1905 | 1 year, 109 days | Imperial Russian Army |

==== Chief of the General Directorate of the General Staff ====
| No. | Portrait | Chief of the General Directorate of the General Staff | Took office | Left office | Time in office | Defence branch |
|---|---|---|---|---|---|---|
| 1 | Fyodor Palitzin | General of the Cavalry; Fyodor Palitzin (1851–1923) | 28 June 1905 | 2 December 1908 | 3 years, 157 days | Imperial Russian Army |
| 2 | Vladimir Sukhomlinov | General of the Cavalry; Vladimir Sukhomlinov (1848–1926) | 2 December 1908 | 11 March 1909 | 99 days | Imperial Russian Army |
| 3 | Alexander Myshlayevsky | General of the Infantry; Alexander Myshlayevsky (1856–1920) | 11 March 1909 | 30 September 1909 | 203 days | Imperial Russian Army |
| 4 | Yevgeny Gerngross | Lieutenant General; Yevgeny Gerngross (1855–1912) | 30 September 1909 | 22 February 1911 | 1 year, 145 days | Imperial Russian Army |
| 5 | Yakov Zhilinsky | General of the Cavalry; Yakov Zhilinsky (1853–1918) | 22 February 1911 | 4 March 1914 | 3 years, 10 days | Imperial Russian Army |
| 6 | Nikolai Yanushkevich | Major General; Nikolai Yanushkevich (1868–1918) | 5 March 1914 | 1 August 1914 | 149 days | Imperial Russian Army |
| 7 | Mikhail Belyaev | Major General; Mikhail Belyaev (1863–1918) | 1 August 1914 | 10 August 1916 | 2 years, 9 days | Imperial Russian Army |
| 8 | Pyotr Averyanov | Lieutenant General; Pyotr Averyanov (1867–1937) | 10 August 1916 | 15 May 1917 | 278 days | Imperial Russian Army |
| 9 | Ivan Romanovsky | Lieutenant General; Ivan Romanovsky (1877–1920) | 18 July 1917 | 26 September 1917 | 134 days | Russian Army |
| 10 | Vladimir Marushevsky | Major General; Vladimir Marushevsky (1874–1952) | 26 September 1917 | 23 November 1917 | 58 days | Russian Army |

=== Council of People's Commissars on War and Navy Affairs (1917–1918) ===
| No. | Portrait | Chief of the General Staff | Took office | Left office | Time in office | Defence branch |
|---|---|---|---|---|---|---|
| 1 | Nikolay Potapov | Major General; Nikolay Potapov (1871–1946) | 23 November 1917 | 8 May 1918 | 166 days | Red Army |

=== Revolutionary Military Council of the Republic (1918–1921) ===
| No. | Portrait | Chief of the All-Russian Main Staff | Took office | Left office | Time in office | Defence branch |
|---|---|---|---|---|---|---|
| 1 | Nikolai Stogov | Lieutenant General; Nikolai Stogov (1873–1959) | 8 May 1918 | 2 August 1919 | 1 year, 86 days | Red Army |
| 2 | Alexander Svechin | Major General; Alexander Svechin (1878–1938) | 2 August 1919 | 22 October 1919 | 81 days | Red Army |
| 3 | Nikolay Rattel | Major General; Nikolay Rattel (1875–1939) | 22 October 1919 | 10 February 1921 | 1 year, 111 days | Red Army |

| No. | Portrait | Chief of the Field Staff | Took office | Left office | Time in office | Defence branch |
|---|---|---|---|---|---|---|
| 1 | Nikolay Rattel | Major General; Nikolay Rattel (1875–1939) | 6 September 1918 | 21 October 1918 | 45 days | Red Army |
| 2 | Fyodor Kostyayev | Major General; Fyodor Kostyayev (1878–1925) | 21 October 1918 | 18 June 1919 | 240 days | Red Army |
| 3 | Mikhail Bonch-Bruyevich | Major General; Mikhail Bonch-Bruyevich (1870–1956) | 18 June 1919 | 22 July 1919 | 34 days | Red Army |
| 4 | Pavel Lebedev | Major General; Pavel Lebedev (1872–1933) | 22 July 1919 | 10 February 1921 | 1 year, 203 days | Red Army |

=== Red Army (1921–1946) ===
==== Chief of the Staff ====
| No. | Portrait | Chief of the Staff | Took office | Left office | Time in office | Defence branch |
|---|---|---|---|---|---|---|
| 1 | Pavel Lebedev | Major General; Pavel Lebedev (1872–1933) | 10 February 1921 | April 1924 | 3 years, 1 month | Red Army |
| 2 | Mikhail Frunze | Major General; Mikhail Frunze (1885–1925) | April 1924 | January 1925 | 9 months | Red Army |
| 3 | Sergey Kamenev | Komandarm 1st rank Sergey Kamenev (1881–1936) | January 1925 | November 1925 | 10 months | Red Army |
| 4 | Mikhail Tukhachevsky | Marshal of the Soviet Union; Mikhail Tukhachevsky (1893–1937) | November 1925 | May 1928 | 2 years, 6 months | Red Army |
| 5 | Boris Shaposhnikov | Komandarm 1st rank Boris Shaposhnikov (1882–1945) | May 1928 | April 1931 | 2 years, 11 months | Red Army |
| 6 | Vladimir Triandafillov | General; Vladimir Triandafillov (1894–1931) (Note: Died in a plane crash.) | May 1931 | 12 July 1931 † | 2 months | Red Army |
| 7 | Alexander Yegorov | Marshal of the Soviet Union; Alexander Yegorov (1883–1939) | July 1931 | September 1935 | 4 years, 2 months | Red Army |

==== Chief of the General Staff ====
| No. | Portrait | Chief of the General Staff | Took office | Left office | Time in office | Defence branch |
|---|---|---|---|---|---|---|
| 1 | Alexander Yegorov | Marshal of the Soviet Union; Alexander Yegorov (1883–1939) | September 1935 | 10 May 1937 | 1 year, 8 months | Red Army |
| 2 | Boris Shaposhnikov | Marshal of the Soviet Union; Boris Shaposhnikov (1882–1945) | 10 May 1937 | August 1940 | 3 years, 2 months | Red Army |
| 3 | Kirill Meretskov | Army General; Kirill Meretskov (1897–1968) | August 1940 | January 1941 | 5 months | Red Army |
| 4 | Georgy Zhukov | Army General; Georgy Zhukov (1896–1974) | February 1941 | 29 July 1941 | 5 months | Red Army |
| (2) | Boris Shaposhnikov | Marshal of the Soviet Union; Boris Shaposhnikov (1882–1945) | 29 July 1941 | 11 May 1942 | 286 days | Red Army |
| 5 | Aleksandr Vasilevsky | Marshal of the Soviet Union; Aleksandr Vasilevsky (1895–1977) | 26 June 1942 | February 1945 | 2 years, 7 months | Red Army |
| 6 | Aleksei Antonov | Army General; Aleksei Antonov (1896–1962) | February 1945 | 22 March 1946 | 1 year, 1 month | Red Army |

=== Soviet Armed Forces (1946–1991) ===
| No. | Portrait | Chief of the General Staff | Took office | Left office | Time in office | Defence branch |
|---|---|---|---|---|---|---|
| 1 | Aleksandr Vasilevsky | Marshal of the Soviet Union; Aleksandr Vasilevsky (1895–1977) | 22 March 1946 | November 1948 | 2 years, 7 months | Soviet Army |
| 2 | Sergei Shtemenko | Army General; Sergei Shtemenko (1907–1976) | November 1948 | June 1952 | 3 years, 7 months | Soviet Army |
| 3 | Vasily Sokolovsky | Marshal of the Soviet Union; Vasily Sokolovsky (1897–1968) | June 1952 | April 1960 | 7 years, 10 months | Soviet Army |
| 4 | Matvei Zakharov | Marshal of the Soviet Union; Matvei Zakharov (1898–1972) | April 1960 | March 1963 | 2 years, 11 months | Soviet Army |
| 5 | Sergey Biryuzov | Marshal of the Soviet Union; Sergey Biryuzov (1904–1964) | March 1963 | 19 October 1964 † | 1 year, 7 months | Soviet Army |
| (4) | Matvei Zakharov | Marshal of the Soviet Union; Matvei Zakharov (1898–1972) | November 1964 | September 1971 | 6 years, 9 months | Soviet Army |
| 6 | Viktor Kulikov | Army General; Viktor Kulikov (1921–2013) | September 1971 | 7 January 1977 | 5 years, 4 months | Soviet Army |
| 7 | Nikolai Ogarkov | Marshal of the Soviet Union; Nikolai Ogarkov (1917–1994) | 7 January 1977 | 6 September 1984 | 7 years, 238 days | Soviet Army |
| 8 | Sergey Akhromeyev | Marshal of the Soviet Union; Sergey Akhromeyev (1923–1991) | 6 September 1984 | 2 November 1988 | 4 years, 62 days | Soviet Army |
| 9 | Mikhail Moiseyev | Colonel General; Army General; Mikhail Moiseyev (1939–2022) | December 1988 | 23 August 1991 | 2 years, 8 months | Soviet Army |
| 10 | Vladimir Lobov | Army General; Vladimir Lobov (born 1935) | 25 August 1991 | 7 December 1991 | 104 days | Soviet Army |
| 11 | Viktor Samsonov | Colonel General; Viktor Samsonov (1941–2024) | 7 December 1991 | 20 March 1992 | 104 days | Soviet Army |

=== Russian Armed Forces (1992–present) ===
| No. | Portrait | Chief of the General Staff | Took office | Left office | Time in office | Defence branch |
|---|---|---|---|---|---|---|
| 1 | Viktor Dubynin | Army General; Viktor Dubynin (1943–1992) | 10 June 1992 | 22 November 1992 † | 165 days | Russian Ground Forces |
| 2 | Mikhail Kolesnikov | Army General; Mikhail Kolesnikov (1939–2007) | 22 November 1992 | 18 October 1996 | 3 years, 331 days | Russian Ground Forces |
| 3 | Viktor Samsonov | Army General; Viktor Samsonov (1941–2024) | 18 October 1996 | 22 May 1997 | 216 days | Russian Ground Forces |
| 4 | Anatoly Kvashnin | Army General; Anatoly Kvashnin (1946–2022) | 22 May 1997 | 19 July 2004 | 7 years, 58 days | Russian Ground Forces |
| 5 | Yuri Baluyevsky | Army General; Yuri Baluyevsky (born 1947) | 19 July 2004 | 3 June 2008 | 3 years, 320 days | Russian Ground Forces |
| 6 | Nikolai Makarov | Army General; Nikolai Makarov (born 1949) | 3 June 2008 | 9 November 2012 | 4 years, 159 days | Russian Ground Forces |
| 7 | Valery Gerasimov | Army General; Valery Gerasimov (born 1955) | 9 November 2012 | Incumbent | 14 years, 8 days | Russian Ground Forces |

== See also ==
- Commander-in-Chief of the Russian Ground Forces
- Commander-in-Chief of the Russian Aerospace Forces
- Commander-in-Chief of the Russian Navy
- Cheget
