= Viktor Sakharov =

Russian lieutenant general

- Виктор Сахаров
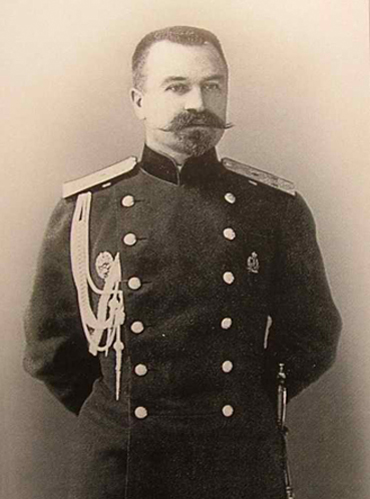
- General Viktor Sakharov in 1904

Minister of War
- In office 7 February 1904 – 21 June 1905
- Monarch: Nicholas II
- Preceded by: Aleksey Kuropatkin
- Succeeded by: Aleksandr Roediger

Chief of the Russian General Staff
- In office 20 January 1898 – 11 March 1904
- Preceded by: Nikolai Obruchev
- Succeeded by: Pyotr Frolov

Personal details
- Born: 20 July 1848 Moscow, Moscow Governorate, Russian Empire
- Died: 22 November 1905 (aged 57) Saratov, Saratov Governorate, Russian Empire
- Relations: Vladimir Viktorovich Sakharov (brother)

Military service
- Allegiance: Russian Empire
- Branch/service: Imperial Russian Army
- Years of service: 1865–1905
- Rank: Lieutenant General
- Battles/wars: Russo-Turkish War; Russo-Japanese War
- Awards: see awards

Viktor Viktorovich Sakharov (Russian: Виктор Викторович Сахаров; 20 July 1848 in Moscow – 22 November 1905 in Saratov) was a Russian lieutenant general and Imperial Minister of War (1904–1905).

== Biography ==
Sakharov was a graduate of the Nicholas Academy of the General Staff and served in the Russo-Turkish War (1877-1878). He was subsequently named Assistant Chief of Staff of the Warsaw Military District, then Quartermaster General of the Warsaw Military District, and then Chief of Staff of the Odessa Military District. In 1898, Sakharov became Chief of the General Staff of the Imperial Russian Army.

In early 1904, after the beginning of the Russo-Japanese War, Sakharov succeeded Aleksey Kuropatkin as a Minister of War, when Kuropatkin was appointed commander-in-chief of the Russian land forces in Manchuria. Sakharov remained in St Petersburg throughout the war, and had little influence on the strategy or tactics of the conflict. He was dismissed from this post by Tsar Nicholas II on 21 June 1905 and replaced by Lieutenant General Aleksandr Rediger on 4 July 1905. In late 1905, Sakharov was sent to Saratov Province to restore order during agrarian disturbances. On 22 November 1905, he was mortally shot by the SR woman terrorist Anastasia Bitsenko in the house of the Saratov governor Pyotr Stolypin.

His brother Vladimir Viktorovich Sakharov was also a general in the Imperial Russian Army.

== Awards ==
- Order of St. Stanislaus 3rd degree
- Order of St. Anne, 3rd degree with swords (1877)
- Order of St. Stanislaus 2nd degree with swords (1877)
- Order of St. Anne, 2nd degree with swords (1878)
- Order of St Vladimir 4th degree, with swords (1878)
- Order of St Vladimir 3rd degree, with swords (1884)
- Order of St. Stanislaus 1st degree (1893)
- Order of St. Anne, 1st degree (1896)
- Order of St Vladimir 2nd degree, (1901)
- Order of the Cross of Takovo, (1901) (Kingdom of Serbia)
- Sword with order of the St.George 4th degree and diamonds (1905)

== Notes ==
Military offices
Preceded by Nikolai Obruchev	Chiefs of the Main Staff of the Imperial Russian Army; 20 January 1898 – 11 March 1904	Succeeded by Pyotr Frolov
