= Yakov Zhilinsky =

Russian cavalry general (1853–1918)

Yakov Grigoryevich Zhilinsky
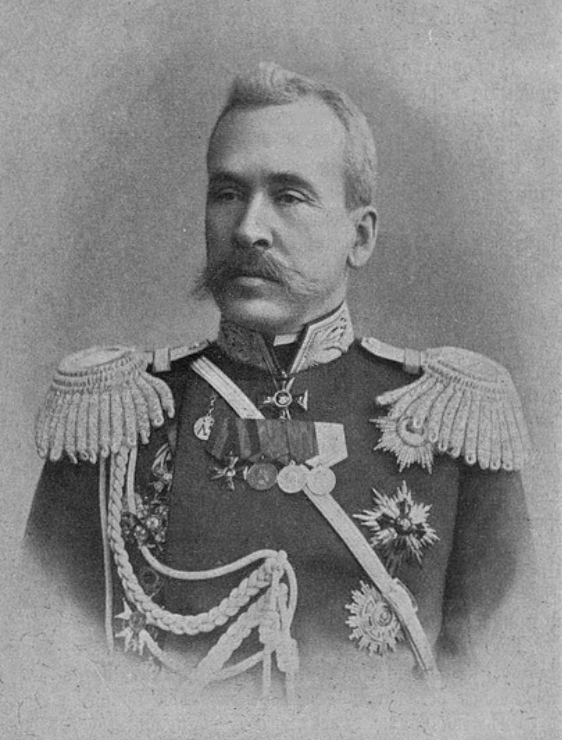

Chief of the General Staff
- In office 2 February 1911 – 4 March 1914
- Monarch: Nicholas II
- Preceded by: Yevgeny Gerngross
- Succeeded by: Nikolai Yanushkevich

Personal details
- Born: 27 March 1853 Mikhaylov, Ryazan Governorate, Russian Empire
- Died: 1918 (aged 64-65) Crimea

Military service
- Allegiance: Russian Empire
- Branch/service: (Russian Empire) Russian Imperial Army
- Years of service: 1876–1917
- Rank: General of the Cavalry
- Commands: 14th Cavalry Division; 10th Army Corps; Governor-General of Warsaw; Warsaw military district; Imperial Russian Army General Staff; Northwestern Front
- Battles/wars: Russo-Japanese War; World War I

Yakov Grigoryevich Zhilinsky (Russian: Яков Григорьевич Жилинский; 27 March 1853 – 1918) was a Russian cavalry general, chief of staff of the Imperial Russian Army from 2 February 1911 to 4 March 1914. He was considered to be one of the main culprits of the failure of the East Prussian Campaign in the early stages of the First World War.

== Biography ==
Zhilinsky was born on March 15, 1853, in Mikhaylov in the Ryazan Governorate. Born to Colonel Grigori I. Zhilinsky and Catherine Petrovna (née Muromtseva), he belonged to a noble family from the Smolensk Governorate. In his early years, he attended the Gymnasium Creiman in Moscow.

He joined active service as a cadet in the Sumy Hussar Regiment. In 1876, he graduated from the Nicholas Cavalry College in St. Petersburg and was assigned to the Horse Guards Regiment of the Imperial Guard as a cornet. He was considered one of the best riders in the school and was in charge of training the regiment.

In 1883, he graduated from Nikolaev Academy of the General Staff at the first category. For excellent success, he was promoted to captain. After serving as a senior aide to the staff of the 1st Grenadier Division, he served from 14 February 1894 on the Military Scientific Committee of the General Staff, a military intelligence organization responsible for the study of foreign countries.

During the Spanish–American War, Zhilinsky served as a Russian military observer with the Spanish Army in Cuba. Upon his return, he published a book analyzing the causes of Spain's defeat.

In 1899, Zhilinskiy served as a member of Russian delegation at the Hague Peace Conference. He was appointed commander of the 52nd Dragoons Regiment from August 1899. In 1900, he was promoted to the rank of major general and was appointed Quartermaster general.

During the Russo-Japanese War (1904–1905), Zhilinsky served as Chief of Staff to the Viceroy of the Far East, Admiral Yevgeni Ivanovich Alekseyev, until the admiral's dismissal in October 1904. He remained in the combat zone to serve Minister of War Aleksey Kuropatkin for the rest of the conflict. He took command of the 14th Cavalry Division in Poland on January 27, 1906, and the 10th Army Corps on July 7, 1907. Promoted to General of the Cavalry on April 18, 1910, Zhilinsky was appointed commander of the Warsaw Military District and Governor-General of Warsaw in 1911.

Zhilinsky also served from 22 February 1911 to 4 March 1914 as Chief of the General Staff of the Imperial Russian Army. At the beginning of World War I, he assumed command of the Northwestern Front. The Northwestern Front included the 1st Army and 2nd Army under the command of General Paul von Rennenkampff and General Alexander Samsonov. After the unsuccessful East Prussian Campaign and the losses at the Battle of Tannenberg and the First Battle of the Masurian Lakes, he was relieved of command despite attempts to blame Rennenkampff for the fiasco. Zhilinsky was sent as a military representative to France from 1915 to 1916 and was recalled to Russia in the autumn of 1916. On 19 September 1917, he was ordered to retire.

After the October Revolution, he attempted to flee Russia but was killed in south Russia in undetermined circumstances.

== Honors ==
- Order of St. Stanislaus, 3rd degree, 1880.
- Order of St. Anne, 3rd degree, 1888
- Order of St. Stanislaus, 2nd degree, 1894.
- Order of St. Anne, 2nd degree, 1896
- Order of St Vladimir, 4th degree, 1899
- Order of St Vladimir, 3rd degree, 1902
- Order of St. Stanislaus, 1st degree with swords, 1904.
- Order of St. Anne, 1st degree with swords, 1905
- Order of St Vladimir, 2nd degree, 1906
- Order of the White Eagle, 1912
- Order of St. Alexander Nevsky, 1913
- Order of Orange-Nassau, Grand Officer with Swords
