= Fyodor Palitzin =

Russian general (1851–1923)

- Фёдор Палицын
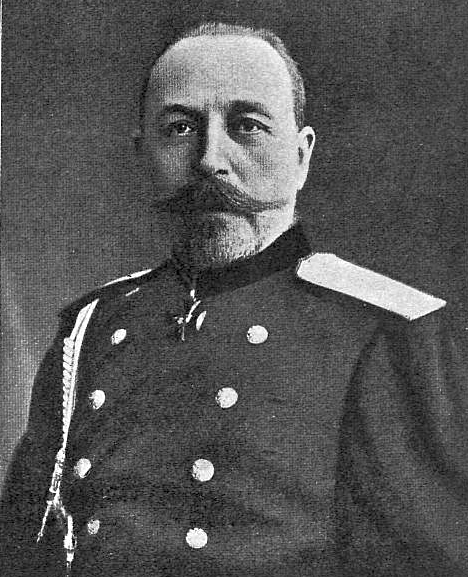

Chief of the Russian General Staff
- In office 28 June 1905 – 2 December 1908
- Monarch: Nicholas II
- Preceded by: Pyotr Frolov
- Succeeded by: Vladimir Sukhomlinov

Personal details
- Born: 28 October 1851 (Gregorian)
- Died: 19 February 1923 Berlin, Weimar Republic
- Education: Pavel Military School; Nicholas General Staff Academy
- Awards: Knight of the Order of St. Alexander Nevsky

Military service
- Allegiance: Russian Empire
- Branch/service: Imperial Russian Army
- Rank: Lieutenant General
- Commands: Caucasus Army; Russian Expeditionary Force in France
- Battles/wars: Russo-Turkish War; World War I; Second Battle of the Aisne

Fyodor Fyodorovich Palitzin (Russian: Фёдор Фёдорович Палицын; 28 October [O.S. 15 October] 1851 – 19 February 1923), also spelled Palitsyn, was an Imperial Russian Army general who commanded the Russian Expeditionary Force in France.

Palitzin attended the Pavel Military School until 1870, when he moved on to the General Staff Academy. Upon graduation in 1877 he served in the Russo-Turkish War. He was appointed chief of the Main Directorate of the General Staff in June 1905, where he played a role in the military reforms until his resignation in 1908: he disagreed with the subordination of the General Staff to the Ministry of War. However, he retained his seat on the Military Council Initially during World War I, he served on the Northwestern Front. Following the removal of Grand Duke Nicholas Nikolaevich of Russia from overall command of the Imperial Russian Army, Palitzin was reassigned to the Caucasus Army, whence he was then sent to France to lead the Russian Expeditionary Force in France.
