= Obruchev =

Obruchev (masculine, Russian: Обручев) or Obrucheva (feminine, Russian: Обручева) is a Russian surname. Notable people with the surname include:

- Nikolai Obruchev (1830–1904), Russian general and military statistician
- Vladimir Obruchev (1863–1956), Russian–Soviet geologist and novelist
