= General Staff Academy =

General Staff Academy may refer to:

- Military Academy of the General Staff of the Armed Forces of Russia
- General Staff Academy (Russian Empire)
