= Ivan Erdeli =

Ivan Georgievich Erdeli
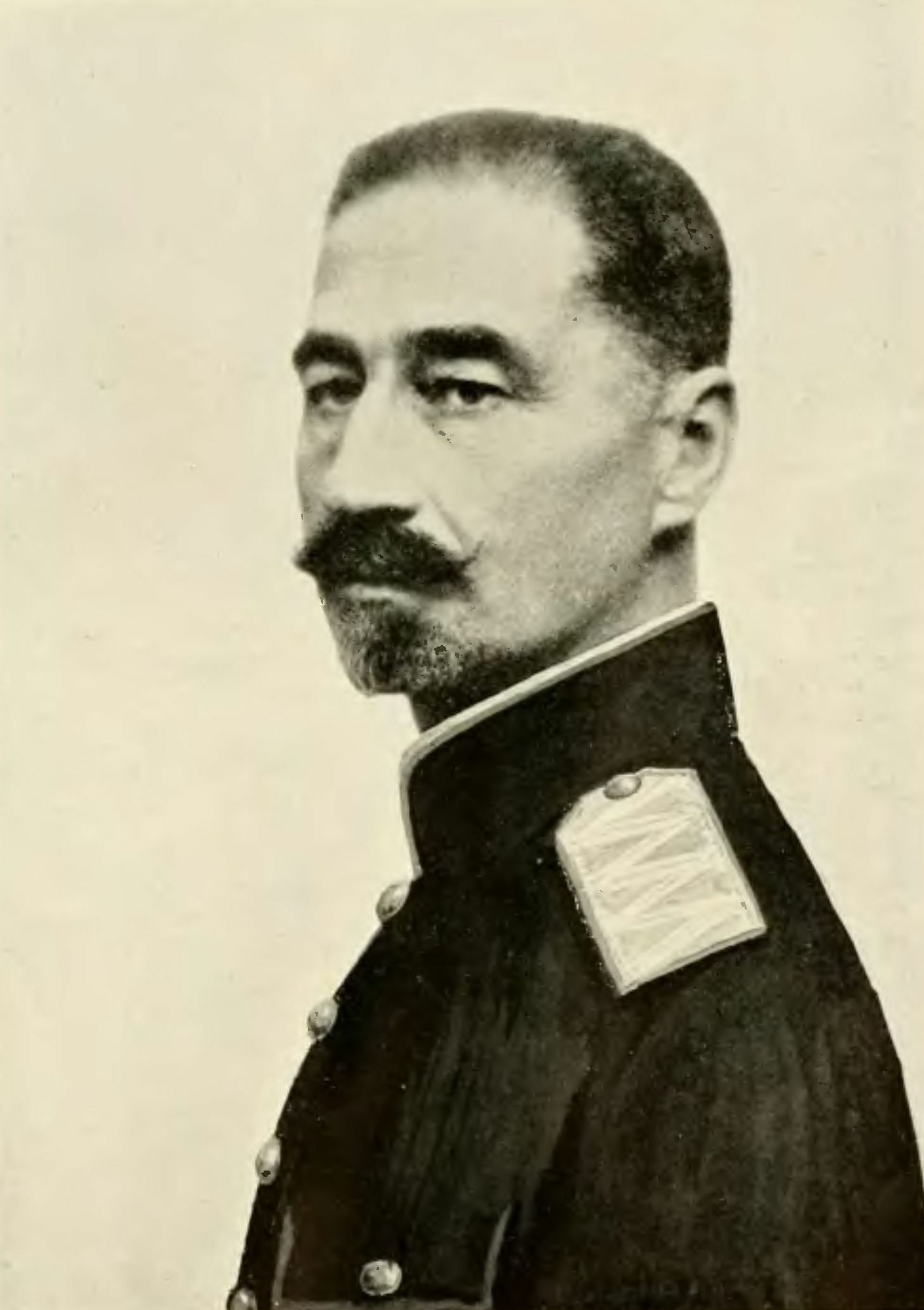
- General of Cavalry Erdeli

Commander–in–Chief of the North Kavkaz
- In office July 1919 – April 25, 1920
- Preceded by: Office established
- Succeeded by: Office abolished

Personal details
- Born: October 27, 1870 Erdelevka, Elisavetgrad Uezd, Kherson Guberniya, Russian Empire
- Died: July 7, 1939 (aged 68) Paris, France
- Resting place: Sainte–Geneviève–des–Bois Cemetery
- Parent: Georgiy Erdeli (father)
- Education: Nikolaevskoe Cavalry School
- Awards: Gold Weapon "For Bravery"; Order of Saint Vladimir; Order of Saint Anna; Order of Saint Stanislav; Order of the Lion and the Sun

Military service
- Allegiance: Russian Empire
- Rank: General of Infantry
- Battles/wars: World War I Civil War

Ivan Georgievich Erdeli (October 27, 1870, Kherson Guberniya – July 7, 1939, Paris, France) was a Russian military commander and General of Cavalry. A participant in World War I and the Civil War. A figure of the White Movement in South of Rossiya. Participant in the First Kuban Campaign. One of the founders of the Volunteer Army.

== Biography ==
=== Origin ===
Of the hereditary nobility of Kherson Guberniya. His ancestors were Hungarian nobles who converted to Orthodoxy and settled in Rossiya in the 18th century. His great–grandfather served in the armies of Pyotr Rumyantsev and Aleksandr Suvorov.

He was born on October 27, 1870, in the village of Erdelevka (Elisavetgrad Uezd, Kherson Guberniya). His father was Egor (Georgiy) Yakovlevich (1807–1876), the Provincial Leader of the Nobility of Kherson Guberniya from 1871 to 1876. His mother was Leonida Nikanorovna, née Tulubeva (1843–1914).

There were eight children in the family. The elder brother was Yakov Egorovich – Governor of Minsk Guberniya and a member of the State Council. His nephew (the son of his older sister, Vera Erdeli) was the writer Yuriy Slyozkin; her grandson was Lev Slyozkin, a historian specializing in American studies, and her great–grandson is the ethnographer Yuriy Slyozkin. Another older sister was Leonida Pishchevich (1868–1941). Her husband was Semyon Pishchevich.

=== Education ===
Graduated from:

- Nikolaevskiy Cadet Corps (1887)
- Nikolaevskoe Cavalry School (1890)
- Nikolaevskaya General Staff Academy (1897)

=== Cavalryman and General Staff Officer ===
He graduated from the school in 1890 and was commissioned into His Majesty's Life Guards Hussar Regiment. From November 1899, he served as a staff officer for special assignments at the Headquarters of the Kavkaz Military District. From September 12, 1900 – Senior Adjutant to the Staff of the Inspector General of Cavalry, Grand Duke Nikolay Nikolaevich. From June 22, 1905, he served as Senior Clerk in the Chancellery of the Council of State Defense, which was headed by Grand Duke Nikolay Nikolaevich. From June 9, 1907, he was commander of the 8th Astrakhan Dragoon Regiment; from May 15, 1910, a Major General and commander of the Life Guards Dragoon Regiment. From November 6, 1912, Quartermaster General of the Staff of the Guard Troops and the Peterburg Military District (under Commander Grand Duke Nikolay Nikolaevich).

=== Participation in World War I ===
From July 19, 1914, Quartermaster General of the 6th Army Staff; from August 9, 1914, Quartermaster General of the 9th Army Staff. From October 18, 1914, Commander of the 14th Cavalry Division; from May 13, 1915, Commander of the 2nd Guards Cavalry Division. Awarded the Saint Georgiy Weapon (1915). From May 1916, he was a Lieutenant General. From November 23, 1916, he was the Chief of the 64th Infantry Division, and from April 6, 1917, the Commander of the 18th Army Corps. From June to July 1917, he was Commander of the 11th Army. He led an army during the June Offensive. Initially, army units managed to break through the Austro–Hungarian front and achieve some successes in the Battle of Zborów. However, when a German army group struck the army's positions in July, units demoralized by anti–war agitation began a chaotic retreat.

From June 18, 1917, he was a General of the Infantry. From July 12, 1917, he commanded the Special Army. He played an active role in General Lavr Kornilov's Uprising, was relieved of his command, arrested, and imprisoned in Bykhov Prison.

=== Participation in the Civil War ===
In November 1917, together with other imprisoned generals, he went to the Don, where from the very first days he participated in the formation of the Volunteer Army. A participant in the First Kuban (Ice) Campaign – a First Campaigner. From January to March 1918, he was the Representative of the Volunteer Army to the Kuban Regional Government. In March and April 1918, he commanded a Separate Cavalry Brigade of the Volunteer Army and saw successful action during the fighting near Ekaterinodar. From May to the end of August 1918, he commanded the 1st Cavalry Division. Participant in the Second Kuban Campaign.

In October 1918, he was sent to Thessaloniki for negotiations regarding arms supplies and the participation of British and French units in the fight against the Bolsheviks.

In January 1919, he was sent to Transcaucasia to establish contact with representatives of the British Command. From April 1919, he replaced General Vladimir Lyakhov as Chief Administrator and Commander of Troops of the Terek–Dagestan Region. From July 1919, he served as Chief Administrator and Commander of Troops in the North Kavkaz; on April 25, 1920, he was transferred to the reserve of officers attached to the Armed Forces of South of Rossiya. He returned to Krym on the ship Rus on August 24, 1920.

=== Emigration ===
In 1920, he emigrated to France, where he worked as an accompanist and a chauffeur. He was actively involved in the activities of the Russian All–Military Union and served as a Board Member of the Mutual Aid Society of Former Yunkers of the Nikolaevskoe Cavalry School. From March 21, 1930, to June 29, 1934, he served as Chairman of the Union of Officers – Participants in the Great War. From June 29, 1934, he served as Head of the 1st Department of the Russian All–Military Union – which brought together its members residing in France – and as Chairman of the French Branch of the Union of Participants in the First Kuban Campaign; however, he soon stepped down from these positions. On October 5, 1937, he was appointed Chairman of the Special Commission for the Investigation of the Case of Major General Nikolay Skoblin, an agent of the People's Commissariat of Internal Affairs of the Soviet Union. The commission continued its work until the end of February 1938, and on March 1, 1938, it published its findings, which confirmed that Skoblin had committed treason.

He died suddenly in Paris on July 7, 1939 (Volkov gives the date of death as July 30). He is buried in the Russian Cemetery at Sainte–Geneviève–des–Bois.

=== Awards ===
- Order of Saint Stanislav, 3rd Class (1900)
- Order of Saint Anna, 3rd Class (1903)
- Order of Saint Anna, 2nd Class (1905)
- Order of Saint Vladimir, 4th Class (1909)
- Order of Saint Vladimir, 3rd Class (1913)
- Order of Saint Stanislav, 1st Class, with Swords (1915)
- Saint Georgiy Weapon (Imperial Order of March 9, 1915)
- Order of Saint Anna, 1st Class, with Swords (1915)
- Order of Saint Vladimir, 2nd Class, with Swords (1916)
- Badge of the 1st Kuban (Ice) Campaign

Foreign orders:

- Persian Order of the Lion and the Sun, 2nd Class (1906)
Gallery

Badge of the 1st Kuban (Ice) Campaign

== Family ==
From 1891, he was married to Mariya Kuzminskaya (1869–1923), the daughter of Senator Aleksandr Kuzminskiy and a niece of Lev Tolstoy's wife, Sofya Andreevna. They were divorced in 1919; in her second marriage, she became Baroness Shtakelberg.

Children:

- Ivan (1892–1926, Marseille). He graduated from the School of Jurisprudence (1913) and served in the First World War as a member of the 4th Rifle Regiment of the Life Guards. In exile in France.
- Mariya (1896–1961, Melbourne). 1st marriage – Fyodor Kramarev (1877–1945), from the nobility of the Kherson Guberniya. 2nd marriage – Pyotr Levonenko (1899–1980). Her son, Dmitriy Kramarev (1922–2007, Melbourne), studied at the Russian Cadet Corps in Yugoslavia. His descendants live in Australia.
- Tatyana (died in childhood).
- Georgiy (1901–1938). He was educated at the Corps of Pages. In October 1920, he left Sevastopol for exile – first to Constantinople, then to Sarajevo. From 1922, he was a cadet at the Crimean Cadet Corps. His wife was Anastasiya Mikhaylovna, née Kornyakova. There were two children in the family.
- Aleksandr (1904–1955). In exile from 1920. He studied at the Russian Cadet Corps in the Kingdom of Serbs, Croats and Slovenes, and at the Crimean Cadet Corps. In 1931, he graduated from the Higher School of Geology in Nancy. His wife was Nina Ivanovna, née Butlerova. Daughter – Kseniya (born 1932). Before the Second World War, Aleksandr Erdeli's family left Europe for South America.

In 1913, General Ivan Erdeli met Mariya Sverbeeva. Their romance spanned many years: "An inexpressible joy – to hold in one's hands these familiar sheets, the blue pencil, your handwriting; to see and to sense that your hand wrote this – that you wrote these lines, and wrote them to me..." (from a letter by Ivan Erdeli to Mariya Sverbeeva; February 22, 1919).

== Sources ==
- Ivan Erdeli // Great Russian Encyclopedia: in 35 Volumes / Editor–in–Chief Yuriy Osipov – Moskva: Great Russian Encyclopedia, 2004–2017
- Konstantin Zalesskiy. Who Was Who in the First World War – Moskva: AST; Astrel, 2003 – 896 Pages – 5,000 Copies – ISBN 5-17-019670-9 – ISBN 5-271-06895-1
- Mariya Nesterovich (1931). In the Struggle Against the Bolsheviks: Memoirs. Foreword by Ivan Erdeli. Paris.
- Sergey Volkov. Officers of the Russian Guard: An Attempt at a Martyrology – Moskva: Russkiy Put, 2002 – ISBN 5-85887-122-4 – Pages 554–555
