= Fyodor Kostyayev =

Russian and Soviet general (1878–1925)

Fyodor Vasilyevich Kostyayev
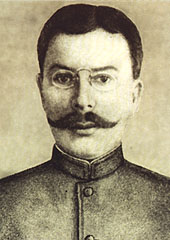
- Fyodor Kostyayev
- Born: 21 April 1872; Mitau, Courland Governorate, Russian Empire
- Died: 27 September 1925 (aged 47); Moscow
- Military career
- Allegiance: Russian Empire; Soviet Union
- Branch: Imperial Russian Army; Soviet Army
- Unit: General Staff of the Soviet Armed Forces
- Conflicts: Russo-Japanese War; World War I Russian Civil War

Fyodor Vasilyevich Kostyayev (Russian: Фёдор Васи́льевич Костя́ев; 20 February 1878 – 27 September 1925) was a military officer in the Russian Imperial Army and following the October Revolution in the Red Army.

== Biography ==
Born to an Orthodox family from the Russian nobility in Courland Governorate. He received his education in Orenburg Nepluyevsky Cadet Corps. In 1899 he graduated from the Mykolaiv Engineering School. He joined service on 1 September 1896, serving in the 2nd Caucasian Sapper and 4th Railway Battalions. From 9 August 1899 he was Podporuchik, and from 13 August 1901 Poruchik. He participated in the Russo-Japanese War of 1904-1905.

In 1905 he graduated from the Nikolaev Academy of the General Staff for the first category, captain from 28 May 1905. The censored command of the company served from 8 November 1905 to 14 December 1906 in the Life Guards of the St. Petersburg Regiment. On 10 January 1907 he was promoted to the assistant to the senior adjutant of the headquarters of the Irkutsk Military District. On 27 March 1911 he was promoted to the assistant to the senior adjutant of the headquarters of the Vilno Military District.

In 1914 for five months he was a staff officer for office work and assignments under the management of the Quartermaster general of the Supreme Commander-in-Chief's staff. On 6 December 1914 he was promoted to colonel. From 31 December 1914 he served as chief of staff of the 30th Infantry Division. From 1 February 1916 commander of the 32nd Siberian Rifle Regiment. From January 1917 Chief of Staff of the 17th Siberian Rifle Division. From 7 August 1917 to November 1917 he was Chief of Staff of the 1st Siberian Army Corps. In 1917, he was promoted to the rank of Major-General, commanded the 132nd Infantry Division. From 16 December 1917 and before demobilization he was at the disposal of the Chief of Staff of the armies of the Western Front.

In 1918 he became part of the newly formed Red Army. He was chief of staff of the Pskov district. In May–June 1918 he served as the head of the Petrograd division. In September–October 1918 he was Chief of Staff of the Northern Front. From October 1918 to June 1919 he became Chief of Staff of the Revolutionary Military Council of the Republic, practically the supreme army commander. In the summer of 1919 he was arrested together with the commander-in-chief Jukums Vācietis.

From September 1919 he taught at the Military Academy. In 1921-1923 he was a member and military representative in the commission for the establishment of the state border with Poland, in 1924-1925 - chairman of the USSR commission for the establishment of the state border with Finland. From 22 May 1920 - full-time teacher of statistics and geography of the Military Academy of the Red Army. He was in charge of the Department of Military Geography and the Service of the General Staff.

Military offices
Preceded by Nikolay Rattel	Chiefs of the Field Staff of the Revolutionary Military Council of the Republic; 21 October 1918 – 18 June 1919	Succeeded by Mikhail Dmitriyevich Bonch-Bruyevich
