= Nikolay Potapov =

Nikolay Mikhailovich Potapov
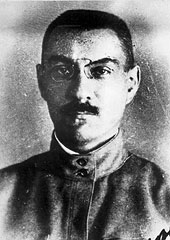
- Nikolay Potapov
- Born: 14 March 1871; Moscow, Russian Empire
- Died: 2 February 1946 (aged 74); Moscow, Russian SFSR, Soviet Union
- Military career
- Allegiance: Russian Empire; Soviet Union
- Service years: 1891-1938
- Unit: General Staff of the Soviet Armed Forces
- Conflicts: World War I Russian Civil War

Nikolay Mikhailovich Potapov (Russian: Николай Михайлович Потапов; 14 March 1871 – 25 February 1946) was a Russian and Soviet military commander and served as the Chief of the General Staff of the Soviet Army.

== Biography ==
He was born to a state servants Orthodox family. In 1888 he graduated from the First Moscow Cadet Corps. In 1891 he graduated from the Mikhailov Artillery School and placed in the Life Guards 3rd Artillery Brigade. In 1897 he graduated from the Nikolaev Academy of the General Staff. On 17 January 1898 he became the senior adjutant of the headquarters of the 38th Infantry Division. From 6 May 1898 he was the chief officer for instructions at the headquarters of the Warsaw Military District. He was commander of a company and served in the Life Guards Regiment of the Keksholm Regiment from 1898 to 1899.

On 18 March 1901 he was appointed to assistant military agent in Vienna. On 10 June 1903 military agent in Montenegro. In 1912 he was promoted to General-Major. With the outbreak of World War I he remained in Montenegro, representing the Russian High command to the Montenegrin High Command.

In 1916 he was recalled to Russia, and on 10 August that year he was appointed head of the General Directorate of the General Staff (GUGSH). On 27 November 1916 he was the head of the evacuation and administration of the prisoners of war of the State Security Service. After the February Revolution, on 13 April 1917, he was appointed Quartermaster-General of the GUGSH.

The well-known figure of the Bolshevik Party, Mikhail Sergeevich Kedrov, who knew Potapov since his youth, later recalled that "after the July days, General Potapov, Assistant to the Chief of the General Staff and Quartermaster General, offered through me his services to the Military Organization of the Bolsheviks.

After the October Revolution he immediately began to cooperate with the Council of People's Commissars, and on 23 November 1917 was appointed chief of the General Staff until May 1918.

Since December 1917 the manager of the affairs of the People's Commissariat of Education. In June–September 1918 he was a member of the Supreme Military Council. From the summer of 1918 a permanent member, from 4 June 1919 - Chairman of the Military Legislative Council under the Revolutionary Military Council (RVS). From 19 November 1921 Assistant to Chief Inspector in the Vsevobuch. From 1 July 1922, Assistant Chief Officer of Vsevobuch. On 1 March 1923 he was appointed to the head of practical classes on the French language of the Military Academy of the Red Army.

In 1922-25, he participated in the Operation Trust of the GPU, the Soviet secret police, acting as the military leader of the Monarchist Organization of Central Russia, misinformed the leaders of the Russian All-Military Union regarding anti-Soviet sentiments at the top of the Red Army.

In February 1928, RVS USSR was awarded a gold watch with the inscription "Stable defender of the Proletarian Revolution from the Revolutionary Military Council of the USSR". In December 1930, enlisted in the reserve, held various positions in the system of the State Military Publishing House. In June 1936 he was re-appointed to the Red Army cadres, he was appointed head of the Department of Translated Literature of the Office of the State Military Publishing House of the USSR NCO. On 21 July 1936 Potapov was awarded the rank of brigade commander.

On 9 May 1938 he retired. He died in February 1946 in Moscow and was laid to rest at the Novodevichy Cemetery.

Military offices
Preceded by Office created	Chiefs of the General Staff of the Council of People's Commissars on War and Navy Affairs; 23 November 1917 – May 1918	Succeeded by Office abolished
