= Military Council (Russian Empire) =

Military Council of the Russian Empire
- Военный совет Российской империи

Agency overview
- Formed: 27 January 1812
- Dissolved: 21 March 1918
- Jurisdiction: Russian Empire
- Headquarters: Moscow
- Parent department: Ministry of War of the Russian Empire

The Military Council (Russian: Военный совет Российской империи) was the highest legislative and advisory body for resolving issues related to military and organizational affairs in the Russian Empire.

== Council of the Minister of War ==
The Supreme Manifesto of 25 June 1811, announced the publication of the "General Institution of Ministries", and in addition to it, on 27 January 1812 - a special "Institution of the War Ministry".

At the same time, there was a significant need to create a special institution under the War Ministry, which could consider legislative proposals and matters, "due to their importance requiring general consideration". As such an institution, the Council of the Minister of War was created, which became the basis from which the legislative institution subsequently developed, which for a hundred years decided all legislative issues related to the War Ministry.

The Council of the Minister of War initially included the Minister of War (who was also the chairman), seven directors of the departments of the Ministry of War: Inspector, Auditor (who was also the auditor general), Artillery, Engineering, Commissariat (who was also the general commissioner), Provisions (who was also the general provision master) and Medical, the director of the chancery of the Minister of War, three permanent members and two appointed annually by the Highest appointment; at the discretion of the minister, outsiders could also be invited, such as factory owners, eminent merchants, etc. In the 1820s, the number of cases subject to the competence of the council increased so much that an “additional provision of the order for the conduct of business in the council of the Minister of War” was required, according to which the number of meetings was increased to four. When the General Staff of His Imperial Majesty was created in 1815, which included the Inspectorate and Audit Departments, their directors ceased to be members of the Council of the Minister of War by virtue of their positions (Auditor Generals Semyon Panov in 1815–1816, Ivan Milovanov in 1824–1826, and Adam Noinsky in 1830-1832 were members of the council, but Semyon Panov held the position of member of the Council even before the General Staff was created, and Milovanov and Noinsky were appointed to its composition before they headed the Audit Department). In 1826, Infantry General Aleksandr Sukin (a member of the Council since 1812) was appointed Chairman of the Council of the Minister of War and remained in this capacity until the end of the council's functioning.

== Military Council ==
In 1832, the Council of the Minister of War ceased to exist, giving way to the Military Council. The Regulations on the Military Council were approved by the Supreme Council on 29 March 1836, but it began to perform its functions on 1 September 1832. The main principles of its organization were outlined in a special note by Emperor Nicholas I and then developed in more detail in the project for the formation of the Ministry of War in 1832 and in the "establishment" of the Ministry of War in 1836.

Initially, according to the idea of Emperor Nicholas I, the Military Council was to be an institution in charge only of the economic part of the military department; legislative affairs were to remain under the jurisdiction of the Department of Military Affairs of the State Council. However, according to the project of the Ministry of War of 1832, legislative affairs in the artillery, engineering, provisions and commissariat departments were to be transferred to the jurisdiction of the Military Council, and, according to the regulation of 1836, the Military Council was vested with advisory functions entirely, as a result of which the military affairs department of the State Council lost all significance and ceased its activities in 1854.

Thus, the Military Council was to be an institution that ensured "the correctness of the disposal of state capital and the fidelity of legislative measures by the actions of the advisory class, composed of men who had acquired the necessary experience in business through long-term service."

The Military Council retained the essence of its original organization until its abolition in 1918. According to the legislation, the Military Council was an institution intended to perform number of tasks:

- Discussing military legislation issues in the military land department, with the exception of legislative issues in the military judicial part;
- Rresolve the most important economic matters;
- Discuss the most important issues regarding the state of the troops and military educational institutions;
- Consider and refer cases on the conduct of preliminary investigations and on the trial of senior military officials for crimes in the service (since 1906, after the establishment of the Supreme Military Criminal Court, only investigative actions remained under the jurisdiction of the Military Council, however, five members of the Military Council were appointed to the court annually);
- General management of the affairs of the military emeritus;

Members of the Military Council were also entrusted with the inspection of troops and military institutions; they could inspect the latter at any time. The Military Council was directly subordinate to the supreme authority, and no government institution or person could give it orders or demand reports from it. The Military Council consisted of a chairman (who was the Minister of War) and members appointed at the direct discretion of the Emperor. In the absence of the Minister of War, the session was chaired by the most senior member of the council by appointment.

The Military Council operated in two compositions: as part of a general meeting formed from all members under the chairmanship of the Minister of War, and as part of private offices formed from the chairman and at least five members appointed by the Emperor for a year from the total number of members of the Military Council. For the preliminary consideration of cases requiring special orders, special advisory commissions could be formed. After the creation of the Supreme Military Criminal Court in 1906, the private office of the Military Council was entrusted with conducting a preliminary examination of the case (with the inclusion in its composition for the consideration of the case of the most senior of the permanent members of the Main Military Court) and deciding the issue of committing to trial. The affairs of the Military Council were managed by the Chief of the Chancellery of the Ministry of War.

In matters of military legislation, the Military Council was the highest legislative body, to which all matters on the improvement of military legislation and matters on the civil administration of the Cossack troops were subject. Legislative issues were considered in a general meeting, and, after their consideration, the Military Council submitted matters relating exclusively to the military department and having no connection with other parts of state administration directly to the Supreme discretion, and matters having a connection with other parts of state administration and legislative matters on the civil administration of the Cossack troops had to be submitted to the highest state institutions (the State Council or the Senate).

In terms of economic management, the Military Council was subject to consideration of financial estimates of expenses and incomes, the most important economic matters, complaints about the actions of all military institutions and military units and persons subordinate to the Ministry of War in the economic part. In this area, the Military Council had significant rights to make independent decisions. For example, all plans for permanent procurement, conditions for various economic enterprises, tenders and contracts for any amount, and so on were subject to its final approval. The most important economic matters were considered in a general meeting; all the rest - in private offices.

Matters in the Military Council were decided by a simple majority of votes. Opinions adopted by the majority were entered into the journal of the Military Council, and this finally decided matters dependent on the Military Council. The staff number of members of the Military Council was initially six; the chairman of the Military Council was the Minister of War; the deputy minister and the head of the military campaign chancellery sat with the right to vote, the director of the chancellery of the Ministry of War was also the manager of the council's affairs (in the period 1858–1869, there was a special position of manager of the council's affairs); in 1869, a new regulation was issued, according to which the Military Council was placed directly subordinate to the Supreme Authority and no institution or person had the right to demand a report from it or give it instructions. The number of its permanent members was increased to 18.

Minister of War Aleksandr Roediger devoted a lot of space to the work of the Military Council in his memoirs. In particular, he wrote:

The Military Council had very important tasks in military legislation and economics. I will not claim that it performed its functions well, since its activities depended entirely on the Chancellery of the Ministry of War: if the latter worked well and critically covered the affairs, then the Military Council conscientiously delved into them, and its decisions in the vast majority of cases were fair and impartial; when the Chancellery agreed with some matter, then its success in the Council was already predetermined.

== See also ==
- Military-Industrial Commission of Russia
- Military-Industrial Commission of the USSR
- Council of Defence
- Security Council of Russia
