= Alexander Lukomsky =

Russian general (1868–1939)

Alexander Sergeyevich Lukomsky
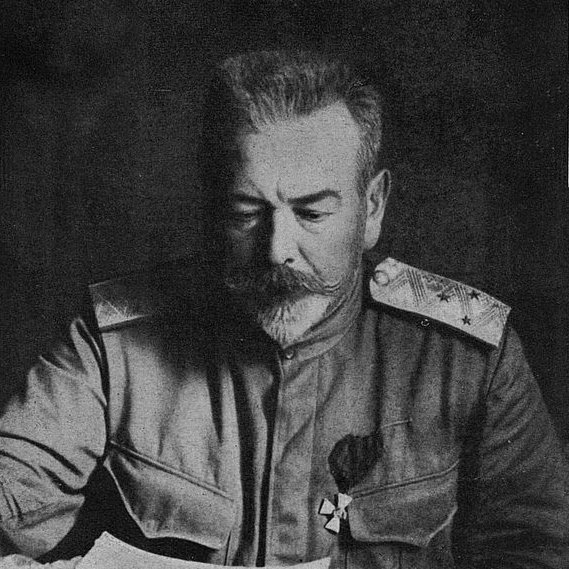
- Born: 22 July [O.S. 10 July] 1868; Poltava Governorate, Russian Empire
- Died: 25 January 1939 (aged 70) Paris, France
- Allegiance: Russian Empire
- Branch: Imperial Russian Army
- Rank: Lieutenant-General
- Commands: Russian Imperial Army
- Conflicts: World War I Russian Civil War
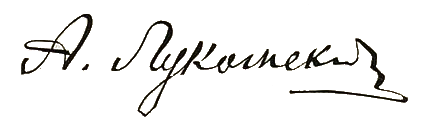
- Signature

Alexander Sergeyevich Lukomsky (Russian: Александр Сергеевич Лукомский; Ukrainian: Олександр Сергійович Лукомський; 22 July [O.S. 10 July] 1868 – 25 January 1939) was a Russian military commander, General Staff, Lieutenant-General (April 1916). He fought in the Imperial Russian Army during World War I and was one of the organizers of the Volunteer Army during the Russian Civil War.

== Life ==
Lukomsky graduated from the Nikolaev Engineering School in 1888. From 1888 to 1892 he served in a sapper battalion and from 1898, company commander and senior adjutant of the staff of the 12th Infantry Division. He graduated from the Nikolaev Academy of the General Staff in 1897.

Lukomsky fought alongside Anton Denikin during the Russian Civil War. He also visited Nikolai Romanov, one of the pretenders to the Imperial throne following the Jassy Conference where nine voted for Denikin compared to four for Nikolai.

Lukomsky died on 25 January 1939, in Paris, France.
