= Ivan Romanovsky =

Imperial Russian Army general (1877–1920)

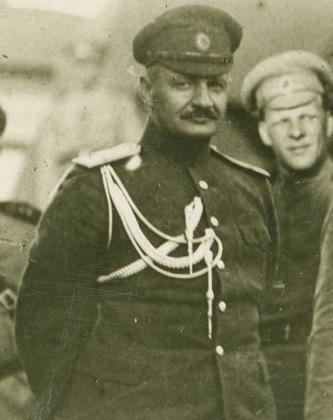
- Born: 28 April [O.S. 16 April] 1877; Luhansk, Russian Empire
- Died: 17 April 1920 (aged 43); Istanbul, Ottoman Empire
- Military career
- Allegiance: Russian Empire (1897–1917); Russian Republic (1917–1920)
- Branch: Imperial Russian Army; Volunteer Army
- Service years: 1897–1920
- Rank: Lieutenant general
- Conflicts: Russo-Japanese War; First World War; Russian Civil War
- Awards: Order of St. George

Ivan Pavlovich Romanovsky (Russian: Ива́н Па́влович Романо́вский; 28 April [O.S. 16 April] 1877 – 17 April 1920) was a general in the Imperial Russian Army and one of the leaders of the counterrevolutionary White movement during the Russian Civil War. Romanovsky served as chief of staff of the Volunteer Army and later the Armed Forces of South Russia.

== Biography ==
Romanovsky was born into a military family in Luhansk. He graduated from the Konstantinovsky Artillery School in 1897 and the Nikolaev Academy of the General Staff, Russia's senior staff college, in 1903. He was assigned to the Life Grenadier Guards of the 2nd Guards Infantry Division. He participated in the 1904 Russo-Japanese War, serving on the headquarters staff of the 18th Army Corps until 1906, when he was transferred to the Turkestan Military District. In 1909 he was assigned to the Russian General Staff.

Upon the Russian entry into World War I, Romanovsky was named chief of staff of the 25th Infantry Division. For action during the Russian invasion of East Prussia he was awarded the Order of St. George in 1914. In August 1915 he was appointed commander of the 206th Infantry Regiment, part of the 52nd Infantry Division. From June to October 1916 he served as chief of staff of the 13th Army Corps. From October 1916 to March 1917 he was quartermaster general for the 10th Army before becoming chief of staff for the 8th Army under Lavr Kornilov, who Romanovsky would follow as a staff officer when Kornilov became Supreme Commander-in-Chief of the Provisional Government's armed forces. From July to September 1917 he served as Chief of the General Directorate of the General Staff.

He was a participant in the 1917 Kornilov affair, the attempted military coup d'état led by Kornilov against the Russian Provisional Government and the Petrograd Soviet. Kornilov and his co-conspirators, including Romanovsky, were arrested in September and imprisoned in Bykhov (today Bykhaw in Belarus). After the October Revolution, however, Romanovsky escaped the prison with Kornilov and traveled to the Rostov region to seek allies among the anti-Bolshevik Don Cossacks. He masqueraded as an ensign during his travels to escape detection by Soviet authorities.

Romanovsky joined the Volunteer Army upon its creation in December 1917 under Mikhail Alekseyev, serving as head of the military headquarters and later as the army chief of staff. He participated in the Ice March from Rostov to Kuban. He became chief of staff of the Armed Forces of South Russia and in 1919 was promoted to lieutenant general. He became a favorite of Anton Denikin, who had also served under Kornilov, after Denikin became commander of the Volunteer Army. Romanovsky was not a popular figure due to his abrasive personality and his advice to Denikin during the summer of 1919 to not prioritize the siege of Tsaritsyn. He was blamed for the defeats the Volunteer Army subsequently suffered as well as the death of Mikhail Drozdovsky, one of his rivals. In March 1920 the Volunteer Army evacuated from Novorossiysk to the Crimea. On March 16, 1920, after arriving in Theodosia, Romanovsky resigned as chief of staff.

On March 22, 1920, after the appointment of Pyotr Wrangel as Commander-in-Chief of the White forces, Romanovsky (along with Denikin) left Theodosia for Istanbul. He was killed on April 17, 1920 in the billiard room of the Russian embassy. His killer is believed to be Mstislav Khoruzin, an embittered former White officer. He was also a member of a monarchist organization and, like many others on the Right, considered Romanovsky to be a "liberal," a freemason, and the chief architect of all the failures of the White cause.

== See also ==
- White movement
- Volunteer Army
- Russian Civil War
