= Alexander Myshlayevsky =

Russian general

Alexander Zakharevich Myshlayevsky
- Александр Захаревич Мышлаевский
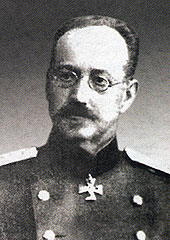
- General Alexander Myshlayevsky
- Born: 24 March [O.S. 12] 1856; Zlatopol (now part of Novomyrhorod), Kiev Governorate, Russian Empire
- Died: 1920
- Military career
- Allegiance: Russian Empire
- Branch: Imperial Russian Army
- Service years: 1874 – 1920
- Rank: General of the Infantry
- Commands: Caucasian Army; Caucasus Military District; Kazan Military District

Alexander Zakharevich Myshlayevsky (Russian: Алекса́ндр Заха́рьевич Мышлае́вский; 1856–1920) was a Russian general during World War I. He was the deputy commander of the Caucasus Army and its field commander during the Battle of Sarikamish. He was originally a military historian graduated from Imperial General Staff Academy. Myshlayevsky was dismissed from service in March 1915. After the February Revolution, from March to June 1917, he served as the commander of the Kazan Military District.
