= Mikhail Bonch-Bruyevich (engineer) =

Russian engineer (1888–1940)

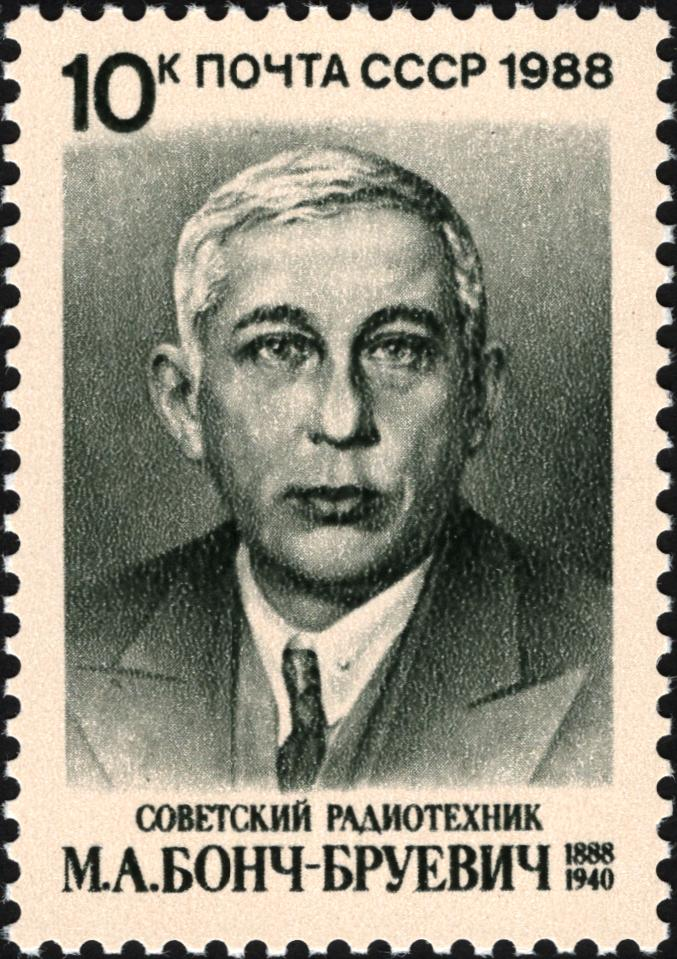
Mikhail Aleksandrovich Bonch-Bruevich

Mikhail Aleksandrovich Bonch-Bruevich (Russian: Михаил Александрович Бонч-Бруевич, IPA: [mʲɪxɐˈil ɐlʲɪkˈsandrəvʲɪdʑ ˈbondʑ brʊˈjevʲɪtɕ]; 22 February 1888 – 7 March 1940), sometimes spelled Bonch-Bruyevich, was an engineer, scientist, and professor. Generally considered the leading authority on radio in Russian Empire and Soviet Union in the first decades of the 20th century, he greatly influenced the pre-radar development of radio-location in that nation.

== Career and accomplishments ==
M. A. Bonch-Bruevich was born in Oryol, a town in Oryol Oblast in Central Russia. The family, which was of royal Polish origin, the original surname being Boncz-Brujewicz, moved to Kiev in 1896. Bonch-Bruevich attended the Nikolaevsky Engineering School in St. Petersburg, completing undergraduate studies in 1909. He then entered the Imperial Russian Army and did graduate study and performed research at the Imperial Institute of Electrical Engineering (IIEE, also called the Military Electrotechnical School) in Petrograd (St. Petersburg). He completed a dissertation in 1914, and was awarded the Candidate of Sciences (C.Sc. – approximately the same as a Ph.D. degree).

=== Radio research ===
Still in the military, Bonch-Bruevich was assigned to the Central Laboratory of the War Department. There he continued research in radio, with an emphasis on vacuum tube (valve) development. As a part of this, he set up one of the first radio tube manufacturing facilities in Russia, becoming the operations director in 1917.

In this period, Bonch-Bruevich also continued teaching and studying at the Leningrad Electro-Technical Institute (LETI – formerly IIEE). (During the turbulent times of World War I and the Bolshevik Revolution, names of many schools and institutions continually changed.) He completed his second dissertation and was awarded the higher Doctor of Sciences (D.Sc.) degree by the LETI. With the receipt of the D.Sc. degree, he also earned the rank of Professor.

In 1918, Bonch-Bruevich went to Nizhny Novgorod in the Volga Federal District and began an affiliation with a prestigious private Nizhny Novgorod Radio Laboratory. There he continued with research in vacuum tubes, and developed a 40-kilowatt, water-cooled tube that he used to build Komintern Radio in Moscow, one of the most powerful radio station in the world. He became the national proponent of radio broadcasting, building 27 stations in various cities. Vladimir Lenin, leader of the Bolshevik Revolution, personally sought him out for advice on radio and its uses. On 5 February 1920 he wrote to Bonch-Bruevich as follows:

"I take this opportunity to express my deep gratitude and sympathy for the great work and inventions in the field of radio you do. Newspaper without paper and without distance that you create will be a great thing. Fully and I promise you all possible assistance to this and similar works. With best wishes." Ulyanov (Lenin).

With the formation of the Soviet Union (USSR) in 1922, all research institutes were nationalized and the Nizhny Novgorod Radio Laboratory became the first of many State research centers. Bonch-Bruevich was named the Technical Director, and over the next several years gained world acclaim for his work on radio equipment. He conducted extensive experiments on high-frequency communications, and, in one project, used pulsed transmission to analyze the nature of the ionosphere. In 1931, this research center was moved to Leningrad and enlarged to become the Tsentral’naya radiolaboratoriya (TsRL, Central Radio Laboratory); Bonch-Bruevich remained the Technical Director.

When Bonch-Bruevich returned to Leningrad with the TsRL, he also resumed his affiliation with the Leningrad Electro-Technical Institute. He was named Head of the Radio Technology Department, and eventually became Dean of the School of Radio as well as the institute's Deputy Director for Academic Affairs. Bonch-Bruevich remained on the LETI faculty until his death.

=== Radio-location (radar) research ===
For some time the Glavnoe artilleriyskoe upravlenie (GAU, Main Artillery Administration) of the Red Army had been seeking means of detecting enemy aircraft at night or above the clouds. In 1933, they approached the TsRL asking for the development of a radiolokatory (radio-location) device (their early name for what ultimately became radar). Bonch-Bruevich quickly accepted this task.

The TsRL was already conducting research on VHF communications, and had built a set operating at 50-cm (600-MHz). The transmitting and receiving antennas were arranged to aim along the flight path of an aircraft, and on 3 January 1934, a Doppler signal was received by reflections from the aircraft at some 600-m distance, showing that detection by radio was possible. Work immediately started on a practical apparatus.

The GAU was also sponsoring radio-location experiments at the Leningradskii Elektrofizicheskii Institut, (Leningrad Electro-Physics Institute, LEPI). In mid-January 1934, the Russian Academy of Sciences held a major conference in Leningrad to discuss this work at LEPI and TsRL as well as similar activities elsewhere. The conference proceedings were published in a journal, available (in the Russian language) for researchers worldwide to learn of this technology in the USSR.

In 1935, both LEPI and TsRL were made a part of Nauchno-issledovatelskii institut-9 (NII-9, Scientific Research Institute #9), a new GAU organization opened in Leningrad. Bonch-Bruevich was named the NII-9 Scientific Director. In addition to radio-location, NII-9 was engaged in projects involving a wide range of disciplines, including military television.

Research on cavity magnetrons was conducted by another institute at Kharkov in Ukraine. In 1936, one of these magnetrons was used by the NII-9 in building a radioiskatel (radio-seeker) called Burya (Storm). Although he had earlier used pulsed transmission in ionospheres experiments, Bonch-Bruevich strongly believed in the potential of continuous-wave (CW) transmission for radio-location, and led the use of this technology in Burya.

In June 1937, all of the work on radio-location in the Soviet Union suddenly stopped. The infamous Great Purge of Joseph Stalin swept over the military high commands and the supporting scientific community. The PVO chief was executed, as were many other military officials at his level. The director of the NII-9 was arrested. Through the influence of Bonch-Bruevich, who had been a favorite of Lenin in the prior decade, NII-9 as an organization was saved, and Bonch-Bruyevich was named the new director.

As work on radio-location gradually returned, a mobile system began development in 1938. Initially called Radio Ulavlivatel Samoletov (RUS, Radio Catcher of Aircraft), it was soon designated as RUS-1. This CW system operated at 4.7 m (64 MHz) and had a truck-mounted transmitter and two truck-mounted receivers. The two receivers, separately located some distance from the transmitter, allowed an estimation of range by using triangulation.

Under Bonch-Bruevich's direction, scientists at NII-9 developed two types of very advanced microwave generators. In 1938, a linear-beam, velocity-modulated vacuum tube (a klystron) was developed, followed the next year by a simpler, single-resonator device (a reflex klystron).

During his career, Bonch-Bruevich wrote and published over 80 scientific papers and books, and patented and transferred to industry about 60 inventions. He died in Leningrad on 7 March 1940. With this loss, there was no strong leader to push the radio-location projects at the NII-9. Also, the next year Germany invaded the USSR, resulting in the evacuation to the east of all critical activities in Leningrad.

== Recognition ==
In June 1940, the Council of People's Commissars of the USSR immortalized the memory of this outstanding engineer, scientist, and teacher by renaming the Institute the M. A. Bonch-Bruevich Electro-Technical Institute of Communications. (In 1993, it was upgraded to university status and given the name Bonch-Bruevich Saint Petersburg State University of Telecommunications.)

== General sources ==
- Brown, Lewis; A Radar History of World War II – Technical and Military Imperatives, Inst. of Physics Pub., 1999
- Erickson, John; "Radio-location and the air defense problem: The design and development of Soviet Radar 1934–40", Social Studies of Science, Vol. 2, p. 241, 1972
- Watson, Raymond C. Jr.; Radar Origins Worldwide, Trafford Publishers, 2009
