= Mikhail Bonch-Bruyevich (commander) =

Russian and Soviet general (1870–1956)

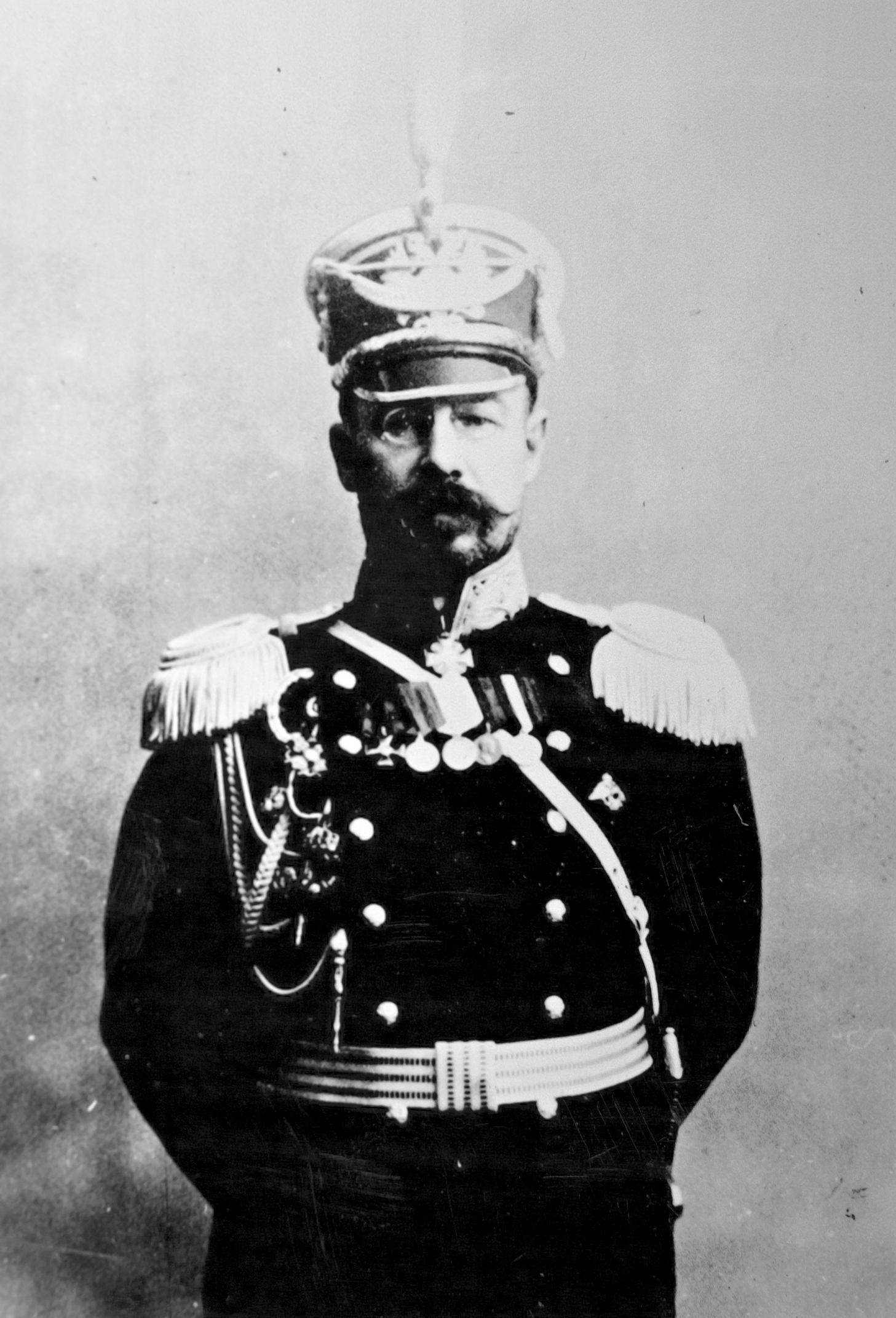
- General Bonch-Bruyevich
- Born: 24 February 1870; Moscow, Russian Empire
- Died: 3 August 1956 (aged 86); Moscow, Russian SFSR, Soviet Union
- Relatives: Vladimir Bonch-Bruyevich (brother)
- Military career
- Allegiance: Russian Empire (1892–1917); Russian SFSR (1918–1919)
- Branch: Imperial Russian Army; Red Army
- Service years: 1892–1919
- Rank: Major General (Russia); Lieutenant General (Soviet)
- Conflicts: First World War; Battle of Galicia; Russian Civil War

Mikhail Dmitriyevich Bonch-Bruyevich (Russian: Михаи́л Дми́триевич Бонч-Бруе́вич; 24 February [O.S. 12 February] 1870 – 3 August 1956) was an Imperial Russian and Soviet military commander (Lieutenant General from 1944). His family belonged to the Lithuanian nobility of the former Grand Duchy of Lithuania.

The son of a land surveyor and a member of the minor nobility, he graduated from the Moscow Institute of Surveying - and later from the General Staff Academy. From 1892 to 1895 Bonch-Bruyevich served as an officer with the Lithuanian Life Guards Regiment, posted at Warsaw.

== First World War ==
At the outbreak of World War I in 1914 Bonch-Bruyevich commanded the 176th Perevolochensky Regiment, based at Chernigov. He witnessed the Russian aviator Pyotr Nesterov's fatal aerial ramming attack on 25 August 1914 [O.S.] during the Battle of Galicia. After the February Revolution of March 1917, the Provisional Government put Bonch-Bruyevich in command of the Russian garrison in Pskov, where he was elected to the executive of the Pskov soviet. After the German army captured Riga (3 September 1917) he was transferred to the northern front. He commanded the Northern Front from 29 August 1917 to 9 September 1917.

== Under Communist rule ==
After the October Revolution of November 1917 Bonch-Bruyevich became one of the first high-ranking army officers to rally to the new regime, with which he had a strong family link: his younger brother, Vladimir Bonch-Bruyevich was a leading Bolshevik. On 19 November 1917 he was appointed chief of staff of the Supreme Commander, Nikolai Krylenko. In March 1918 he was appointed military director of the Supreme Military Council, and chief of field staff of the Revolutionary Military Council, and played a major role at the start of the Russian Civil War in organising the Red Army and the defence of the Soviet state. Former fellow-officers now in the White army declared him an outlaw, and attempted to catch him by raiding a train which they thought he was on. This incident may have contributed to his decision to resign his command.

From March 1919 to October 1923 Bonch-Bruyevich served as the head of the Supreme Geodetic Administration (Russian: Высшее геодезическое управление (ВГУ)) for the Supreme Economic Soviet. He was arrested in 1923 and accused of sabotage, but released after the head of the OGPU, Felix Dzerzhinsky intervened. In 1925 he organised the bureau of aerial photography. He was arrested again in February 1931, along with other former imperial army officers suspected of plotting against the Soviet regime, but was released without charge.

He survived the Stalinist purges, and was promoted to the rank of divisional commander as the mass arrests of Red Army officers began in 1937. In 1944 he was promoted again - to the rank of lieutenant general.

Military offices
Preceded by Fyodor Kostyayev	Chiefs of the Field Staff of the Revolutionary Military Council of the Republic; 18 June 1919 – 22 July 1919	Succeeded by Pavel Pavlovich Lebedev
