= Nikolai Obruchev =

Nikolai Nikolayevich Obruchev
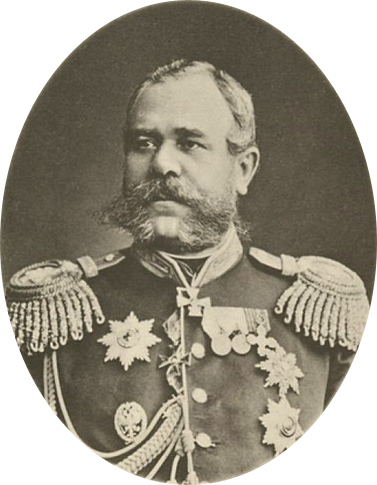
- Nikolai Nikolayevich Obruchev
- Born: 1830; Warsaw, Congress Poland, Russian Empire
- Died: 1904 (aged 73–74); France
- Military career
- Allegiance: Russian Empire
- Branch: Imperial Russian Army
- Rank: General
- Conflicts: Russo-Turkish War
- Awards: Order of St. George III Class; Order of the Cross of Takovo; Order of Prince Danilo I

Nikolai Nikolayevich Obruchev (1830–1904) was a General Staff Officer in the Imperial Russian Army, military statistician, planner and chief of the Main Staff.

== Biography ==
Obruchev was born in Warsaw to a military family. He entered the First Cadet Corps and went on to the Nicholas Military Academy in 1848. In 1858, he founded Voyenny Sbornik (Military Collection) as a professional military journal. However he was removed from the position after printing articles critical of Russian military logistics in the Crimea War. He became a protégé of Dmitry Milyutin, who in 1863 appointed him secretary of the Military Academic Committee of the Main Staff. From this position he helped ensure Milyutin's military reforms were put into effect.

He played a key role in preparing for the Russo-Turkish War of 1877-1878. In July 1877, he was posted to the Caucasus front, where he successfully planned the defeat of the Turkish Army. He was then moved to the Balkan front, where his plan for winter operations helped lead to the capitulation of the Ottoman Empire.

In 1881 Pyotr Vannovskiy, the new Minister of War, appointed him chief of the Main Staff. Obruchev now played a role in rearming the Russian Army, constructing fortifications on the western military frontier and laying plans for amphibious operation across the Bosphorus. He proposed reorganising the Main Staff into five directorates: First and Second Quartermaster Generals, Adjutant General, Military Communications and Military Topography. However, this structure was not implemented until 1903.

He attended the Franco-Russian Military Convention of 1892 and persuaded Nicholas II not to intervene in the Sino-Japanese War of 1894 - 1895.

Obruchev retired from active service in 1897 and died in France in June 1904.
