= General Staff Academy (Russian Empire) =

Russian military academy (1832–1918)

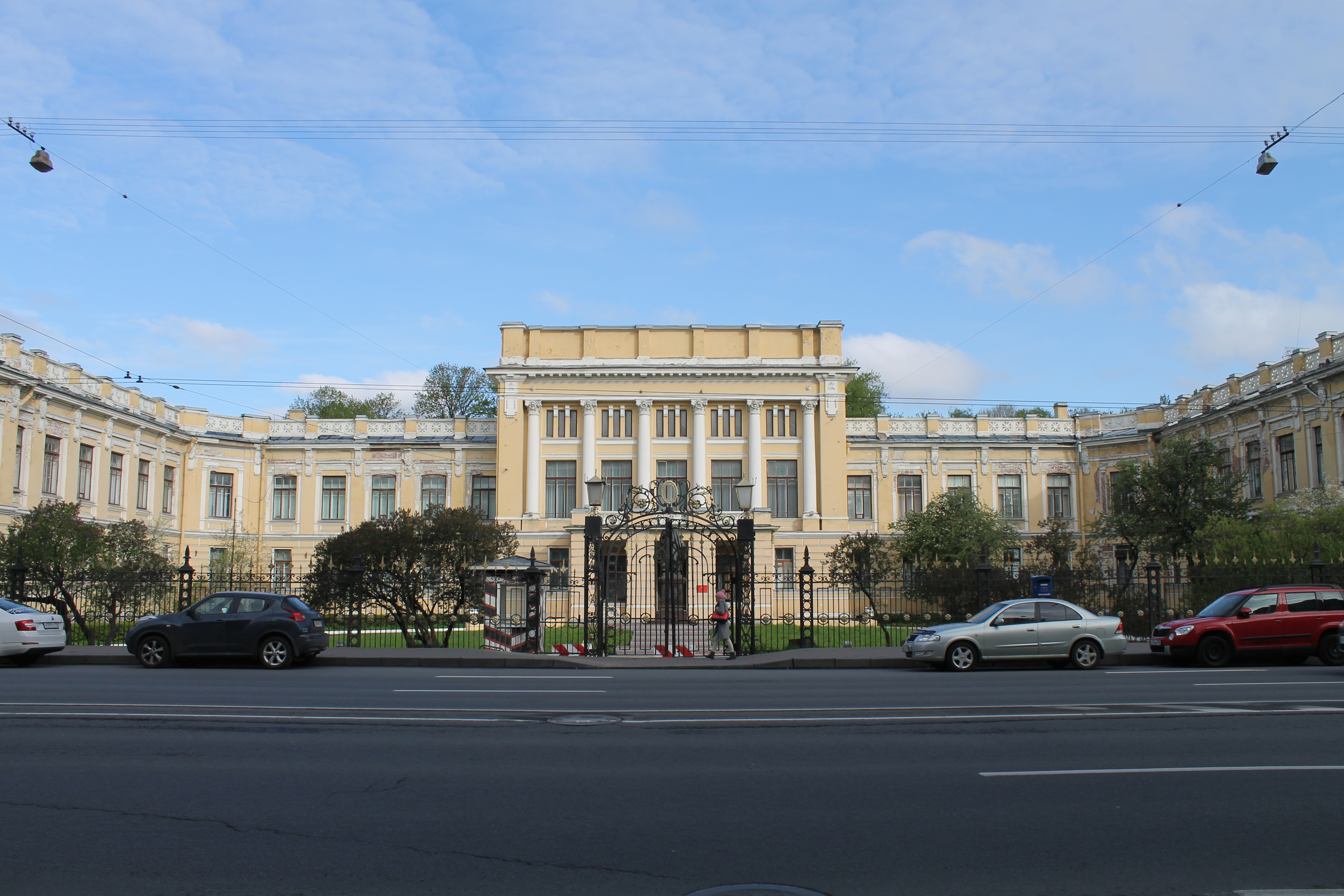
Imperial Nicholas Military General staff Academy (1832–1918)

The General Staff Academy (Russian: Академия Генерального штаба, or Akademiya General'nogo shtaba) was a Russian military academy, established in 1832 in St.Petersburg. It was first known as the Imperial Military Academy (Императорская военная академия), then in 1855 it was renamed Nicholas General Staff Academy (in commemoration of Emperor Nicholas I) and in 1909 - Imperial Nicholas Military Academy (Императорская Николаевская военная академия).

According to Peter Kenez, "The Nicholas Academy, or Staff College, gave the highest military education in Russia. The Academy was organized, as were many institutions of the Russian army, on the German model. Only the best officers, after some years of service in regiments, could enter this academy. Of the annual 150 graduates, the 50 best students received appointment at the General Staff and the others returned to their regiments. Practically the entire high command of the Russian army in the World War and the Volunteer Army in the Civil War were graduates of the College of the General Staff."

The academy trained Imperial Russian Army officers with higher military education and military land surveyors. It admitted officers of all arms of military service up to the rank of stabs-captain inclusive. The academy offered two principal courses, one additional course and had a geodesic department. Those who graduated from the additional course used to join the General Staff. The alumni had the right to an accelerated promotion to the next rank and commanding posts. The academy used to employ theoreticians and historians, such as Mikhail Dragomirov, Dmitry Milyutin, Alexander Myshlayevsky. From 1832 to 1918, the General Staff Academy trained 4,532 General Staff officers.

Among academy's alumni were Abdolhossein Teymourtash, Nikolai Obruchev, Fyodor Radetsky, Mikhail Skobelev, and Nikolai Stoletov. Many of its alumni would become leaders of the White movement, such as Aleksandr Kolchak and Pyotr Wrangel. Some others would take the side of the Bolsheviks as military experts and become Soviet military leaders and politicians, such as Mikhail Bonch-Bruevich, Jukums Vācietis, Sergei Kamenev, Boris Shaposhnikov, Vladimir Egoryev. Most of these commanders were executed in the 1930s.

Also several Estonian military leaders, such as Johan Laidoner, Jaan Soots and Andres Larka, came from General Staff Academy. One of its graduates, Mykola Kapustiansky, would become a General in the army of the Ukrainian National Republic and later a founder of the Organization of Ukrainian Nationalists. Many Latvian military leaders were graduates of the academy, including the first commander-in-chief of the Latvian Armed Forces, Dāvids Sīmansons.

In March 1918, the General Staff Academy was transformed into the Red Army Military Academy. In the summer of that same year, the academy was evacuated to Kazan, where its staff would join the Volunteer Army of Admiral Kolchak. In 1921, the General Staff Academy was disbanded. The term was reintroduced in 1936, when the Voroshilov Military Academy of the USSR Army General Staff was established.

== See also ==
- Soviet military academies
- General Staff Academy (Russia)
