= Allied leaders of World War I =

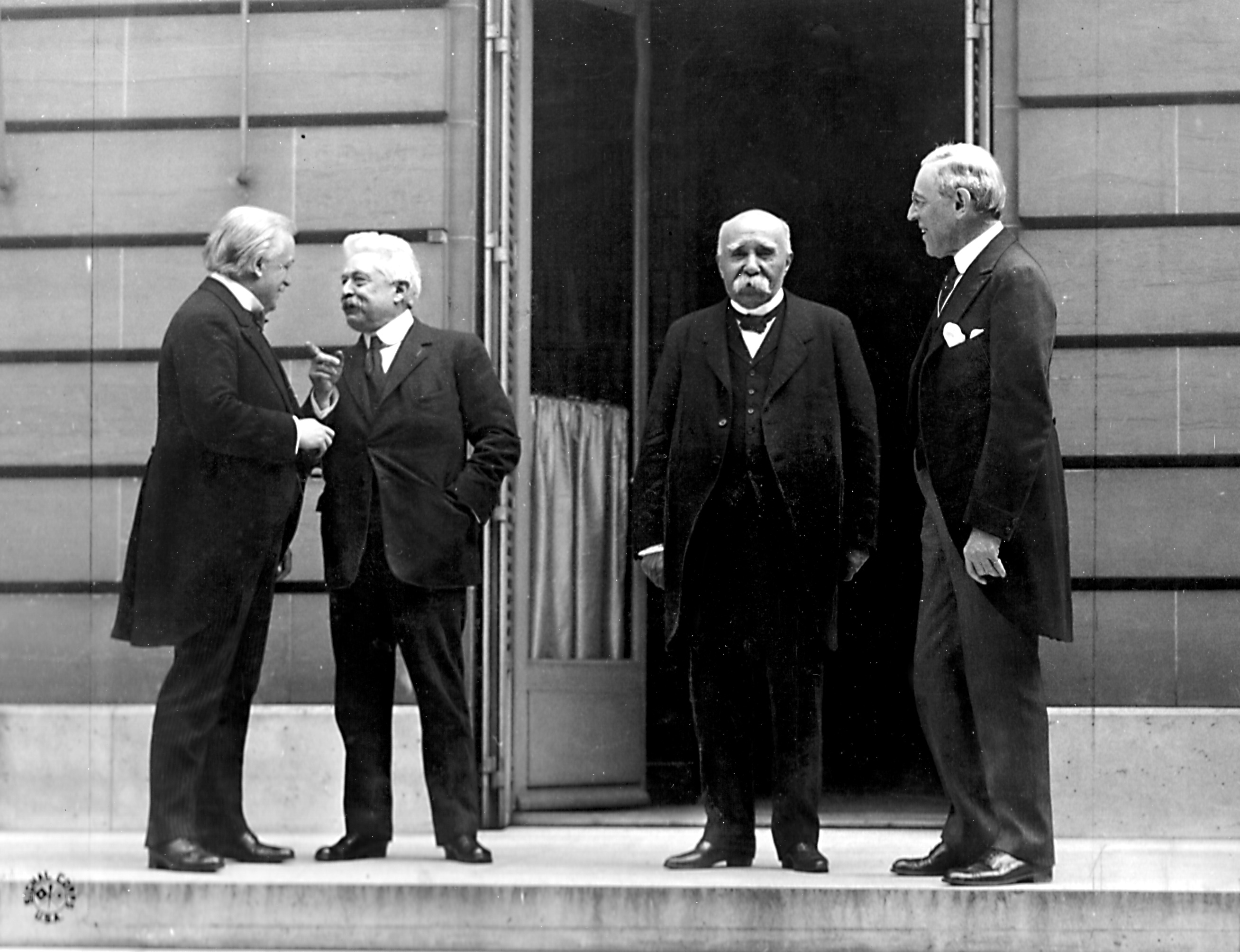
The Council of Four (from left to right): Prime Minister David Lloyd George (United Kingdom), Prime Minister Vittorio Emanuele Orlando (Italy), Prime Minister Georges Clemenceau (France) and President Woodrow Wilson (United States) in Versailles.

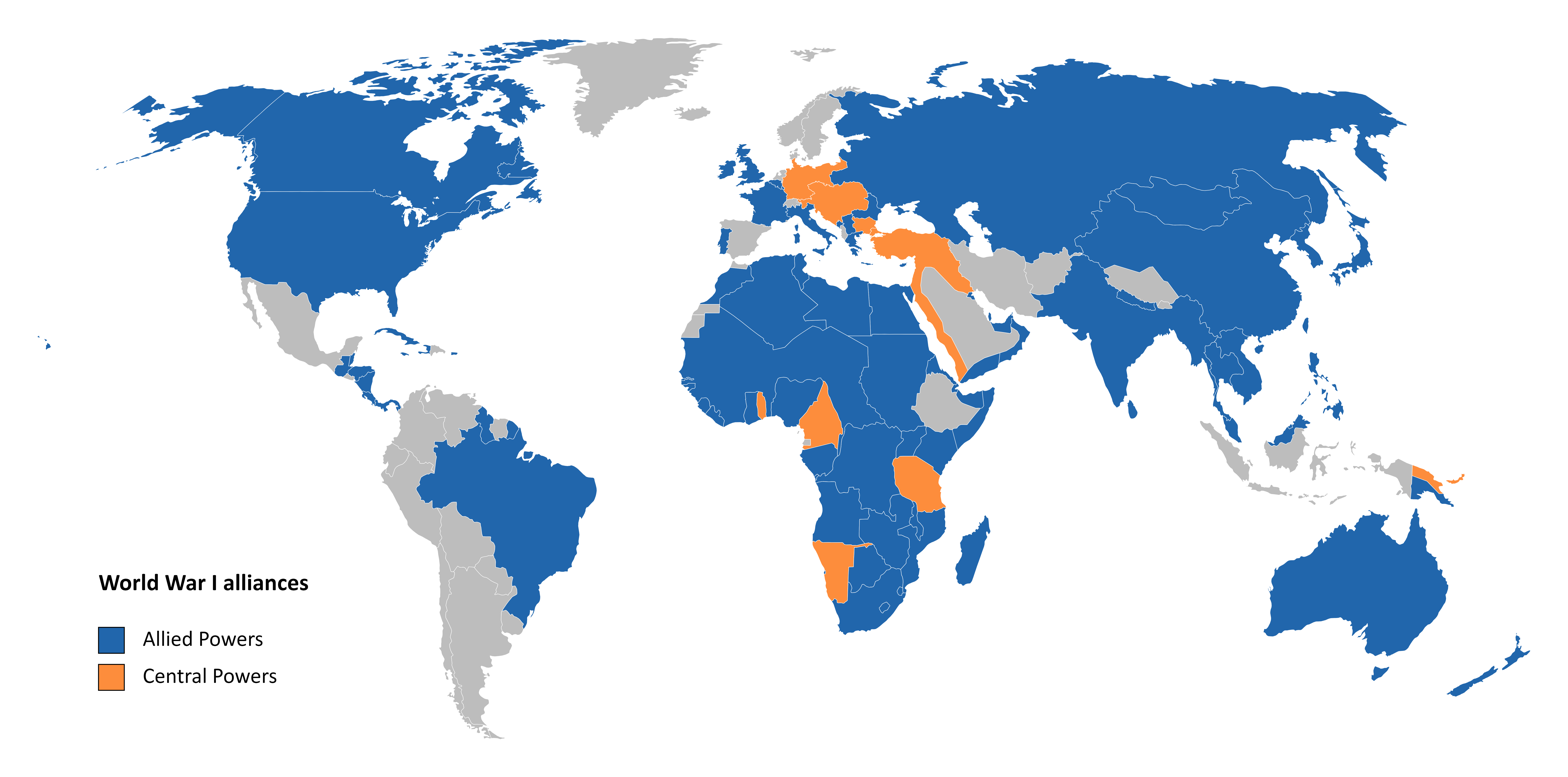
Map of the World showing the participants in World War I. Those fighting along with the Allied Powers (at one point or another) are depicted in blue, the Central Powers in orange, and neutral countries in grey.

The Allied leaders of World War I were the political and military figures that fought for or supported the Allied Powers during World War I.

== Russian Empire ==
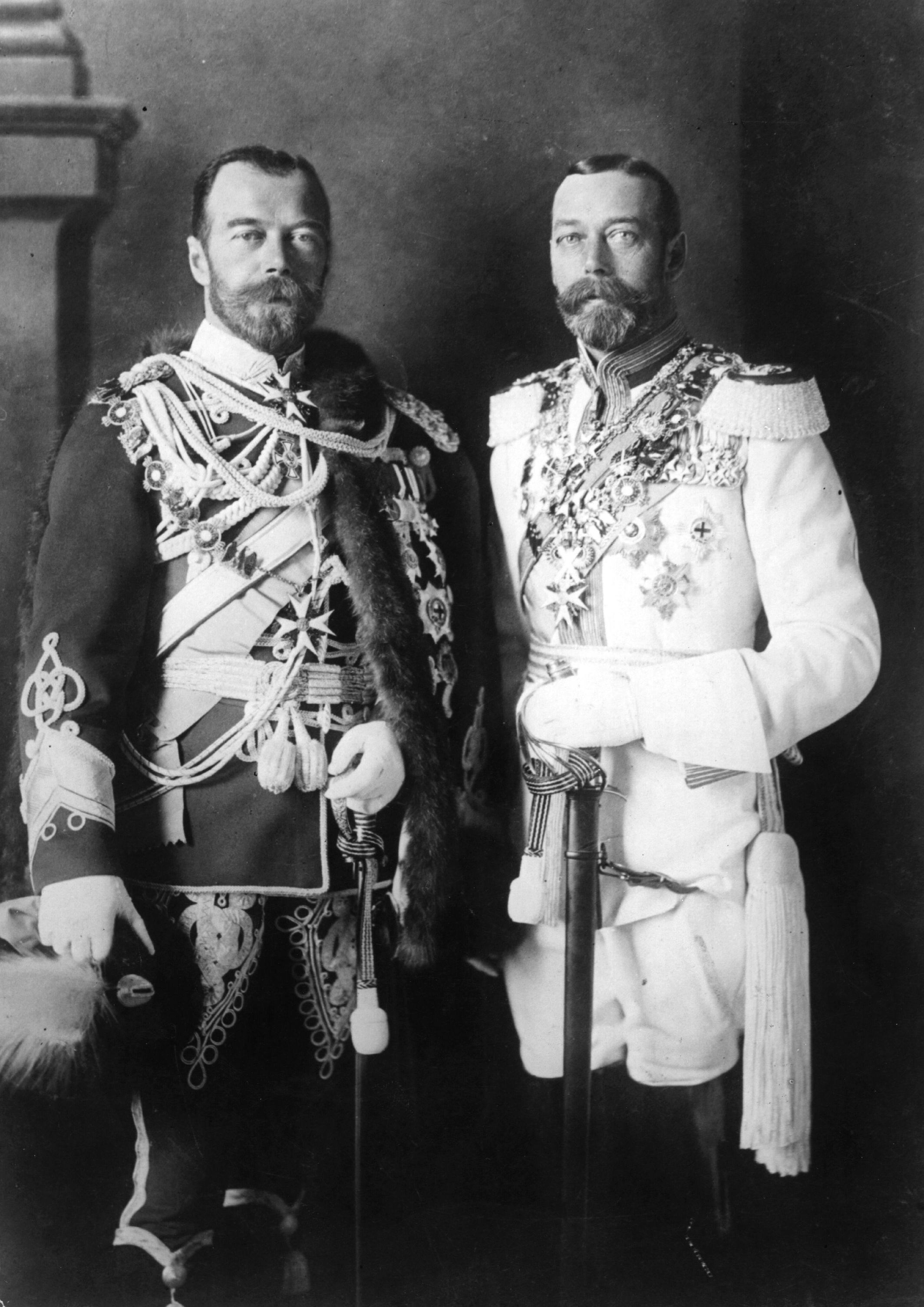
King George V (right) with his first cousin Tsar Nicholas II, Berlin, 1913. Note the close physical resemblance between the two monarchs.

- Nicholas II – Last Tsar of Russia, titular King of Poland, and Grand Duke of Finland.
- Georgy Lvov – Prime Minister of the Russian Provisional Government (1917)
- Alexander Kerensky – Minister of War (1917), Prime Minister of the Russian Provisional Government (1917)
- Grand Duke Nicholas Nikolaevich – Commander-in-Chief and Viceroy in the Caucasus
- Ivan Goremykin – Prime Minister of Russia (1914–1916)
- Boris Stürmer – Prime Minister of Russia (1916)
- Alexander Trepov – Prime Minister of Russia (1916–1917)
- Nikolai Golitsyn – Prime Minister of Russia (1917)
- Vladimir Sukhomlinov – Minister of War (1909–1915)
- Alexei Polivanov – Minister of War (1915–1916)
- Dmitry Shuvayev – Minister of War (1916–1917)
- Mikhail Belyaev – Minister of War (1917), Chief-of-Staff (1914–1916)
- Alexander Guchkov – Minister of War (1917)
- Ivan Grigorovich – Minister of Navy (1911–1917)
- Nikolai Yanushkevich – Chief-of-Staff (1914)
- Pyotr Averyanov – Chief-of-Staff (1916–1917)
- Ivan Romanovsky – Chief-of-Staff (1917)
- Vladimir Marushevsky – Chief-of-Staff (1917)
- Mikhail Alekseyev – Commander of Southwestern Front (1914), Northwestern Front (1915), Chief of Staff (1915–1917), Commander-in-Chief of the Army (1917)
- Yakov Zhilinsky – Commander of the Northwestern Front in the early stages of the war (1914)
- Alexander Samsonov – Commander of the Second Army for the invasion of East Prussia
- Paul von Rennenkampf – Commander of the First Army for the invasion of East Prussia
- Nikolay Ivanov – Commander of the Russian army on the Southwestern Front (1914–1916) and responsible for much of the action in Galicia
- Aleksei Brusilov – Commander of the Southwestern Front (1916–1917), then provisional Commander-in-Chief after the Tsar's abdication
- Lavr Kornilov – Commander of the Southwestern Front and Commander-in-Chief (August 1917)
- Vladislav Klembovsky – Commander of the Northern Front (1917) followed by becoming Commander-in-Chief in August 1917
- Nikolai Ruzsky – Commanded the 3rd Army, Northwestern Front (1914–1915) and lastly the Northern Front (1915)
- Aleksey Kuropatkin – Commander of the Northern Front (1916)
- Paul von Plehwe – Commander of the 5th Army, 12th Army and briefly the Northern Front (1916)
- Aleksei Evert – Took part in the Invasion of Galicia as commander of the 10th Army, later commanded the Western Front (1915–1917)
- Anton Denikin – Led the 8th Army in the Brusilov Offensive and commanded the Western Front in 1917.
- Illarion Ivanovich Vorontsov-Dashkov – Governor General of the Caucasus Viceroyalty and Commander of the Caucasus Army (1914–1915),
- Nikolai Yudenich – Commander of the Russian forces in the Caucasus Campaign (1917)
- Andranik Ozanian – Commander of the Armeno-Russian forces in Caucasus Campaign
- Andrei Zayonchkovski – Commander of the Russian-Romanian Dobruja Army in the Romanian Campaign
- Vladimir Viktorovich Sakharov – Commanded the 11th Army (1915–1916), the Danube Army (1916) and then became deputy commander-in-chief of Romanian Front (1916–1917)
- Dmitry Shcherbachev – Commanded the 11th Army and later became deputy commander-in-chief of the Romanian Front in 1917
- Mikhail Diterikhs – Commander of the Russian Expeditionary Force at the Macedonian front
- Grand Duke Alexander Mikhailovich – Chief of the Imperial Russian Air Service
- Andrei Eberhardt – Commander of Black Sea Fleet (1914–16)
- Alexander Kolchak – Commander of Black Sea Fleet (1916–17)
- Nikolai Essen – Commander of Baltic Fleet (1913–1915)

== French Third Republic ==
- Raymond Poincaré – President of France (1913–1920)
- René Viviani – Prime Minister of France (1914–1915)
- Aristide Briand – Prime Minister of France (1915–1917)
- Paul Painlevé – Prime Minister of France (1917 and 1925)
- Georges Clemenceau – Prime Minister of France and Minister of War (1917–1920)
- Adolphe Messimy – Minister of War (1914)
- Alexandre Millerand – Minister of War (1914–1915)
- Marie-Jean-Lucien Lacaze – Minister of War (1917)
- Paul Painlevé – Minister of War (1917)
- Joseph Joffre – Commander-in-Chief of the French Army (1914–1916); Marshal of France from the end of 1916
- Ferdinand Foch – Commander of French Army Group North (1914–1916), Commander-in-chief and Generalissimo of the Allied Armies (1918); Marshal of France from August 1918
- Robert Nivelle – Commander-in-Chief of the French Army (1916–1917)
- Philippe Pétain – Commander-in-Chief of the French Army (1917–1918); Marshal of France from November 1918
- Maxime Weygand – General in the French Army and one of the Permanent Military Representatives in the Allied Supreme War Council
- Augustin Dubail – Commanded the 1st Army (1914–1915) followed by Army Group East at Battle of Verdun until 1916. He was later military governor of Paris (1916–1918)
- Fernand de Langle de Cary – Commander of the 4th Army in the Battle of the Ardennes, 1914. Later took command of Central Army Group in 1915–1916.
- Victor d'Urbal – Commander of all French troops in Belgium in 1914, then the 8th Army (1915–1916) and 10th Army which participated in the Second and Third Battle of Artois
- Maurice Sarrail – Commander of the Army of the Orient and which evolved to the Allied Army of the Orient on the Macedonian front (1915–1917)
- Adolphe Guillaumat – Commander of the Allied Army of the Orient (1917–1918), then became military governor of Paris and was appointed to the Supreme War Council
- Louis Franchet d'Espèrey – Commander of Army Group North 1916–1918, The Allied Army of the Orient and in the Liberation of Serbia (1918)
- Joseph Gallieni – Military Governor of Paris and Minister of War (1915–1916)
- Michel-Joseph Maunoury – Commander of the 6th Army (1914–1915) during the First Battle of the Marne
- Pierre Roques – Commanded the 1st Army (1915–1916) and served as Minister of War (1916)
- Marie-Eugène Debeney – General of the 1st Army (1917–1918) and Chief of Staff to Philippe Pétain
- Paul Maistre – Commander of the 6th Army (1917), the 10th Army as part of the Italian Expeditionary Force in the Italian Front (1917–1918) ). Finally the Northern Army Group (1918)
- Henri Putz – Commander of the Army Detachment of the Vosges which later became the 7th Army (1914–1915)
- Louis de Maud'huy – Commander of the 10th Army (1914–1915), followed by command of the 7th Army in 1915, notably at the Battle of Hartmannswillerkopf
- Georges Louis Humbert – Commander of the 8th Army (1915) followed by command of the 3rd Army (1915–1918)
- Denis Auguste Duchêne – Commander of the 6th Army (1917–1918) during the Third Battle of the Aisne
- Charles Mangin – Commanded the 6th Army (1916–1917) in the Second Battle of the Aisne and later the 10th Army in the Second Battle of the Marne
- Henri Gouraud – Led the Oriental Expeditionary Forces in 1915 during the Gallipoli Campaign where he lost his arm, later commanded the 4th Army (1915–1916 & 1917–1918)
- François Anthoine – Commander of the 1st Army during the Battle of Passchendaele (1917)
- Henri Mathias Berthelot – General of French Military Mission in Romania and the Fifth Army
- Noël Èdouard de Castelnau – Commander of the 2nd (1914–1915), Central Army Group (1915) and Eastern Army Group (1918)
- Émile Fayolle – Commander of the 1st Army (1916–1917), Army Group Center (1917), French divisions to the Italian Front (1917–1918) and the Army Group Reserve (1918)
- Hubert Lyautey – Resident-General of Morocco (1912–1916), suppressing rebellions in North Africa during the war. Minister of War (1916–1917)
- Jean César Graziani – Commander of the Italian 12th Army in the Battle of Vittorio Veneto
- Milan Rastislav Štefánik – Commander of Czechoslovak Legions
- Édouard Barès – Commander of French Air Force

== British Empire ==
- King George V – King of the United Kingdom and the British Dominions beyond the Seas, Emperor of India

=== United Kingdom ===
- H. H. Asquith – Prime Minister of the United Kingdom (1908–1916), Secretary of State for War (1914)
- David Lloyd George – Prime Minister of the United Kingdom (1916–1922), Secretary of State for War (1916)
- Herbert Kitchener – Secretary of State for War (1914–1916)
- The Earl of Derby – Secretary of State for War (1916–1918)
- The Viscount Milner – Secretary of State for War (1918–1919)
- James Wolfe Murray – Chief of the Imperial General Staff (1914–1915), British Troops in Egypt (1916–1917)
- William Robertson – Chief of the Imperial General Staff (1916–1918)
- John French – Commander-in-Chief of the BEF (1914–1915) and Commander-in-Chief, Home Forces (1915–1918)
- Douglas Haig – Commander-in-Chief of the British Expeditionary Force (1915–1918)
- Henry Wilson – Advisor of John French and Chief of the Imperial General Staff (1918–1922)
- Archibald Murray – Chief of Staff of the British Expeditionary Force (1914–1915), Chief of the Imperial General Staff (1915) and Commander of the Egyptian Expeditionary Force (1916–1917)
- Edmund Allenby – Commander of the Third Army and later the Egyptian Expeditionary Force (1917–1918)
- Henry Horne – Commander of the First Army (1916–1918)
- Horace Smith-Dorrien – Led the II Corps of the BEF at the Battle of Mons and Le Cateau, he then commanded the 2nd Army (1914–1915)
- Herbert Plumer – Commander of the V Corps at the Second Battle of Ypres (1915) followed by command of the 2nd Army (1915–1917). He then led the Italian Expeditionary Force before going back to the 2nd Army (1918)
- Henry Rawlinson – British General of the Fourth Army, notably at the Battle of the Somme and Battle of Amiens
- Hubert Gough – Commander of the Fifth Army (1916–1918)
- George Milne – Commander of the British Salonika Army at the Salonika front (1916–1918)
- The Earl of Cavan – Commander of the Italian 10th Army at the Battle of Vittorio Veneto
- Ian Hamilton – Commander of the Mediterranean Expeditionary Force during the Gallipoli Campaign
- Reginald Wingate – Commander of the British forces in the Anglo-Egyptian Darfur Expedition
- Charles Macpherson Dobell – Commander of the Allied force in the Kamerun campaign
- Hastings Ismay – Commander of the British forces in the Somaliland Campaign
- Stanley Maude – Commander during the Mesopotamian Campaign
- Prince Louis of Battenberg – First Sea Lord (1912–1914)
- Lord Fisher – First Sea Lord (1914–1915)
- Sir Henry Jackson – First Sea Lord (1915–1916)
- Sir John Jellicoe – Commanding officer of the Grand Fleet (1914–1916), First Sea Lord (1916–1918)
- Sir Rosslyn Wemyss – First Sea Lord (1918–1919)
- David Beatty – Commanding officer of the Grand Fleet (1916–1919)
- Winston Churchill – First Lord of the Admiralty (1911–1915)
- Arthur Balfour – First Lord of the Admiralty (1915–1916), Secretary of State for Foreign Affairs (1916–1919)
- Sir Edward Carson – First Lord of the Admiralty (1916–1917)
- Sir Eric Geddes – First Lord of the Admiralty (1917–1919)
- John de Robeck – Naval Commander in the Gallipoli Campaign
- David Henderson – Director-General of Military Aeronautics (1913–1917)
- Sir Edward Grey, Bt. – Secretary of State for Foreign Affairs (1905–1916)`

=== Australia ===
- Joseph Cook – Prime Minister of Australia (1913–1914)
- Andrew Fisher – Prime Minister of Australia (1914–1915)
- Billy Hughes – Prime Minister of Australia (1915–1923)
- Ronald Munro Ferguson – Governor-General of Australia
- Edward Millen – Minister for Defence (to 17 September 1914)
- George Pearce – Minister for Defence (from 17 September 1914)
- Jens Jensen – Minister for the Navy (1915–1917)
- Joseph Cook – Minister for the Navy (1917–1920)
- William Birdwood – Commander of the ANZAC (1914–1916) and Australian Imperial Force (1915–1919)
- John Monash – Commander of the Australian Corps (1918)
- William Holmes – Commander of the Australian Naval and Military Expeditionary Force (1914–1915)
- Harry Chauvel – Commander of Desert Mounted Corps (1917–1919)

=== Dominion of Canada ===
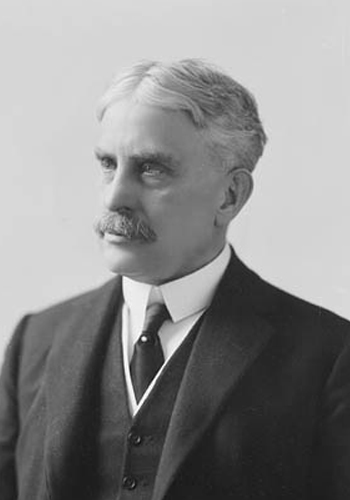
Robert Borden, Prime Minister of Canada

- Robert Borden – Prime Minister of Canada (1911–1920)
- The Duke of Connaught and Strathearn – Governor-General of Canada (1911–1916)
- The Duke of Devonshire – Governor-General of Canada (1916–1921)
- Sam Hughes – Minister of Militia and Defence (1911–1916)
- Albert Edward Kemp – Minister of Militia and Defence (1916–1917) Minister of Overseas Military Forces of Canada (1917–1918)
- Joseph Flavelle – Chairman of Imperial Munitions Board (1915–1919)
- Edwin Alderson – Commander of the Canadian Corps (1915–1916)
- Julian Byng – Commander of the Canadian Corps (1916–1917) and British Third Army (1917–1919)
- Arthur Currie – Commander of 1st Canadian Division (1915–1917) and Canadian Corps (1917–1919)

=== British Raj ===
- Lord Hardinge – Viceroy of India (1910–1916)
- Lord Chelmsford – Viceroy of India (1916–1921)
- Robert Crewe-Milnes – Secretary of State for India (1911–1915)
- Austen Chamberlain – Secretary of State for India (1915–1917)
- Edwin Samuel Montagu – Secretary of State for India (1917–1922)
- Beauchamp Duff – Commander-in-Chief, India (1914–1916)
- Charles Monro – Commander-in-Chief, India (1916–1920), Mediterranean Expeditionary Force (1915–1916) and the British First Army (1916)
- John Nixon – Commander in the British Indian Army
- James Willcocks – Commander of the I Indian Corps on the Western Front

=== Union of South Africa ===
- Louis Botha – Prime Minister of South Africa
- The Earl of Buxton – Governor-General of South Africa
- Jan Smuts – Commander in the South-West Africa Campaign and in the East African Campaign (1916–1917)
- Jacob van Deventer – commanded the Union Defence Force and later all forces of the South African Overseas Expeditionary Force in the East African Campaign (1917–1918)

=== Dominion of New Zealand ===
- William Massey – Prime Minister of New Zealand
- The Earl of Liverpool – Governor-General of New Zealand
- Alexander Godley – Chief of Army of New Zealand Military Forces (1910–1914) and The New Zealand Expeditionary Force (1914–1918)
- Alfred William Robin – Quartermaster-General and Chief of Army of New Zealand Military Forces (1914–1919)
- Andrew Hamilton Russell – Commander of the New Zealand Division

=== Dominion of Newfoundland ===
- Edward Morris – Prime Minister of Newfoundland (1909–1917)
- John Crosbie – Prime Minister of Newfoundland (1917–1918)
- William Lloyd – Prime Minister of Newfoundland (1918–1919)
- Walter Edward Davidson – Governor of Newfoundland (1913–1917)
- Charles Alexander Harris – Governor of Newfoundland (1917–1922)
- Arthur Lovell Hadow – Commander of the Royal Newfoundland Regiment in the Battle of the Somme 1916
- James Forbes-Robertson – Deputy Commanding Officer of the 1st Battalion of the Royal Newfoundland Regiment, acting commander during the Battle of Monchy-le-Preux (part of the Battle of Arras)

== Kingdom of Serbia ==
- Peter I – King of Serbia
- Crown Prince Alexander – Regent, nominal Commander-in-Chief
- Nikola Pašic – Prime Minister (1912–1918)
- Radivoje Bojović – Minister of War (1914–1915)
- Radomir Putnik – Chief of Staff of the Serbian Army (1914–1915)
- Živojin Mišić – Deputy Chief of General Staff (1914), Commander of First Army (1914–1915; 1917) and Chief of General Staff (1918)
- Petar Bojović – Commander of First Army (1914), Deputy Chief of General Staff (1915–1916), Chief of General Staff (1916–1918) later Commander of First Army (1918)
- Stepa Stepanovic – Commander of Second Army (1914–1918)
- Pavle Jurišić Šturm – Commander of Third Army (1914–1916)

== Kingdom of Montenegro ==
- Nikola I – King of Montenegro
- Janko Vukotić – Prime Minister and Commander of the 1st Army
- Božidar Janković – Chief of Staff of the Montenegrin Supreme Command
- Petar Pešić – Chief of Staff of the Montenegrin Supreme Command
- Andrija Radović – Prime Minister in Exile (1916–1917)
- Krsto Popović – General during the Montenegrin Campaign

== Belgium ==
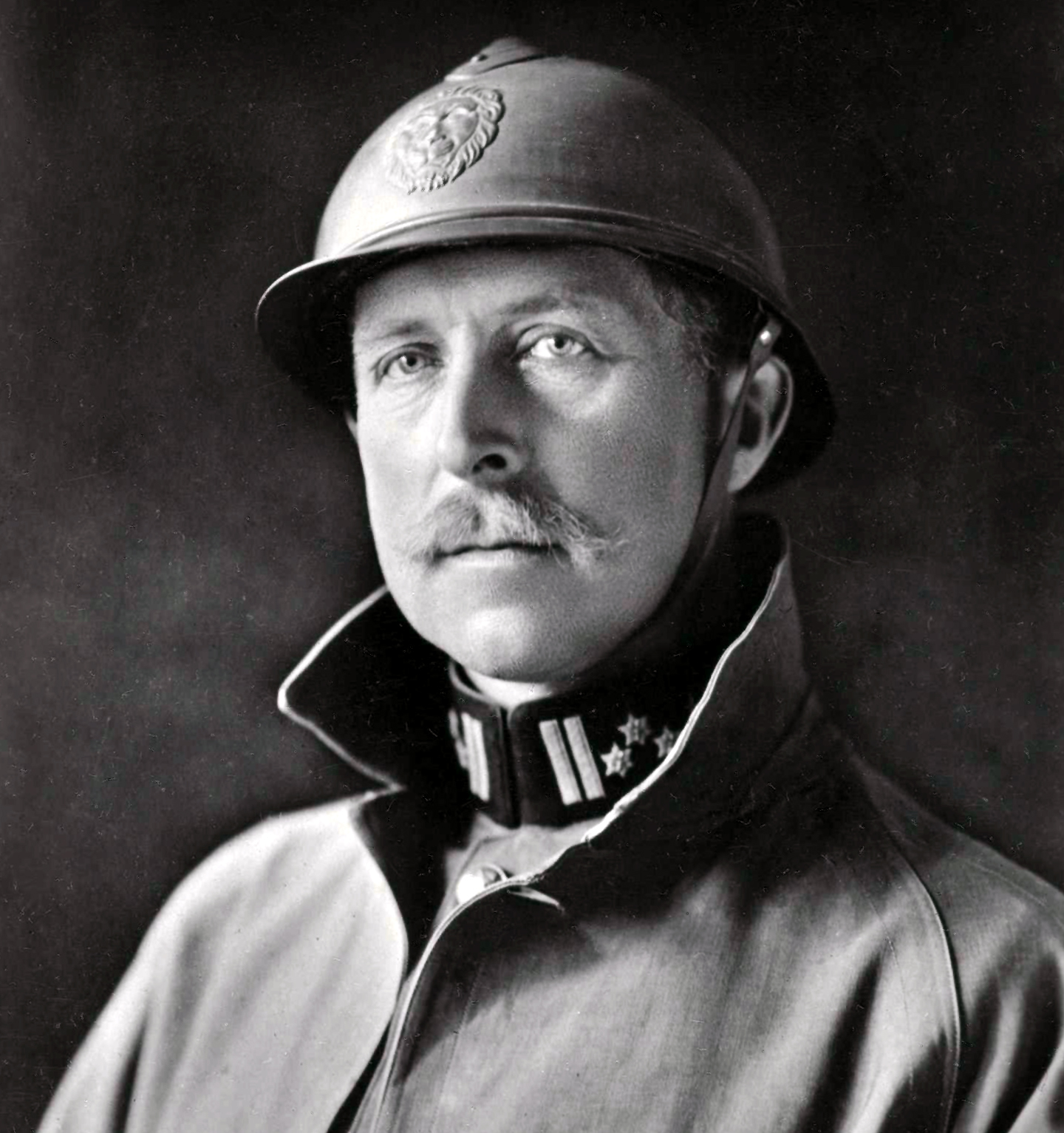
King Albert I

- Albert I of Belgium – King of the Belgians and Commander-in-chief
- Charles de Broqueville – Prime Minister (1911–1918)
- Gérard Cooreman – Prime Minister (1918)
- Antonin de Selliers de Moranville – Chief of Staff until September 6, 1914
- Félix Wielemans – Deputy Chief of Staff (1914) and Chief of Staff (1914–1917)
- Louis Ruquoy – Chief of Staff (1917–1918)
- Cyriaque Gillain – Chief of Staff (1918)
- Émile Dossin de Saint-Georges – Commander of the 2nd Division in the German invasion of Belgium, later Military envoy of the Belgian Government-in-exile
- Alphonse Jacques de Dixmude – General notable for his role in the Battle of the Yser, later commanded the 3rd Division (1917–1919)
- Gérard Leman – General commanding the defense of Liège
- Charles Tombeur – Commander of the colonial Force Publique in the East African theater

== Luxembourg ==
- Marie-Adélaïde – Grand Duchess of Luxembourg
- Paul Eyschen – Prime Minister

== Kingdom of Italy ==
King Victor Emanuel III of Italy

- Victor Emmanuel III – King of Italy
- Antonio Salandra – Prime Minister of Italy (1914–1916)
- Paolo Boselli – Prime Minister of Italy (1916–1917)
- Vittorio Orlando – Prime Minister of Italy (1917–1919)
- Vittorio Italico Zupelli – Italian Minister of War (1914–1916) (1918)
- Paolo Morrone – Italian Minister of War (1916–1917)
- Gaetano Giardino – Italian Minister of War (1917)
- Vittorio Luigi Alfieri – Italian Minister of War (1917–1918)
- Luigi Cadorna – Chief of Staff of the Italian Army (1914–1917)
- Armando Diaz – Chief of Staff of the Italian Army (1917–1919)
- Emanuele Filiberto – Commander of the Third Army through all 12 Battles of the Isonzo
- Guglielmo Pecori Giraldi – Commander of the First Army (1916–1918)
- Luigi Capello – Commander of several Army Corps and later the Second Army in 1917
- Gaetano Giardino – Commander of several Army Corps and close advisor to Armando Diaz, stopped the Austrian Offensive in the Second Battle of the Piave River as commander of the Fourth Army (1918)
- Mario Nicolis di Robilant – Commander of the Fourth Army (1915–1918) and Italian representative to the Allied Supreme War Council
- Pietro Frugoni – Commander of the Second Army in the first four Battles of the Isonzo (1915–1916), later commanded the newly created Fifth Army
- Enrico Caviglia – Commanded the XXIV Army Corps in the Eleventh Battle of the Isonzo and was later in command of the newly created Eight Army
- Ernesto Mombelli – Italian commander on the Macedonian front
- Paolo Thaon di Revel – Commander-in-Chief of the Italian Navy
- Alfredo Acton – Chief of Staff of the Italian Navy
- Luigi Amedeo – Commander-in-Chief of the Adriatic Fleet of Italy
- Maurizio Moris – Head of Italian military aviation

== Kingdom of Romania ==
- Ferdinand I – King of Romania
- Ion I. C. Brătianu – Prime Minister of Romania (1914–1918)
- Alexandru Averescu – Prime Minister of Romania (1918) and Commander of the 2nd Army, 3rd Army, then Army Group South
- Vintilă Brătianu – Minister of War
- Vasile Zottu – Chief of the General Staff of Romania (1914–1916)
- Constantin Prezan – Commander of the 4th (also known as Northern Army), later Chief of the General Staff of Romania (1916–1918)
- Ioan Culcer – Led the 1st Army during the Battle of Transylvania
- Eremia Grigorescu – Commander of the II Corps, VI Corps, VI Corps and finally the 1st Army during the Battle of Mărășești
- Constantin Cristescu – Chief of Staff of the 2nd and 3rd Army and later of Army Group Averescu. Later commanded the Northern and 1st Army
- Mihail Aslan – Commander of the 3rd Army
- Artur Văitoianu – Commander of the II Corps during the Battle of Mărăști, later commander of the Second Army (1917–1918)
- Ion Dragalina – Commander of the 1st Division at the Battle of Orșova, later briefly commander of the 1st Army (1916)
- Eustațiu Sebastian – Commander of the Romanian Navy (1909–1917)

== United States ==
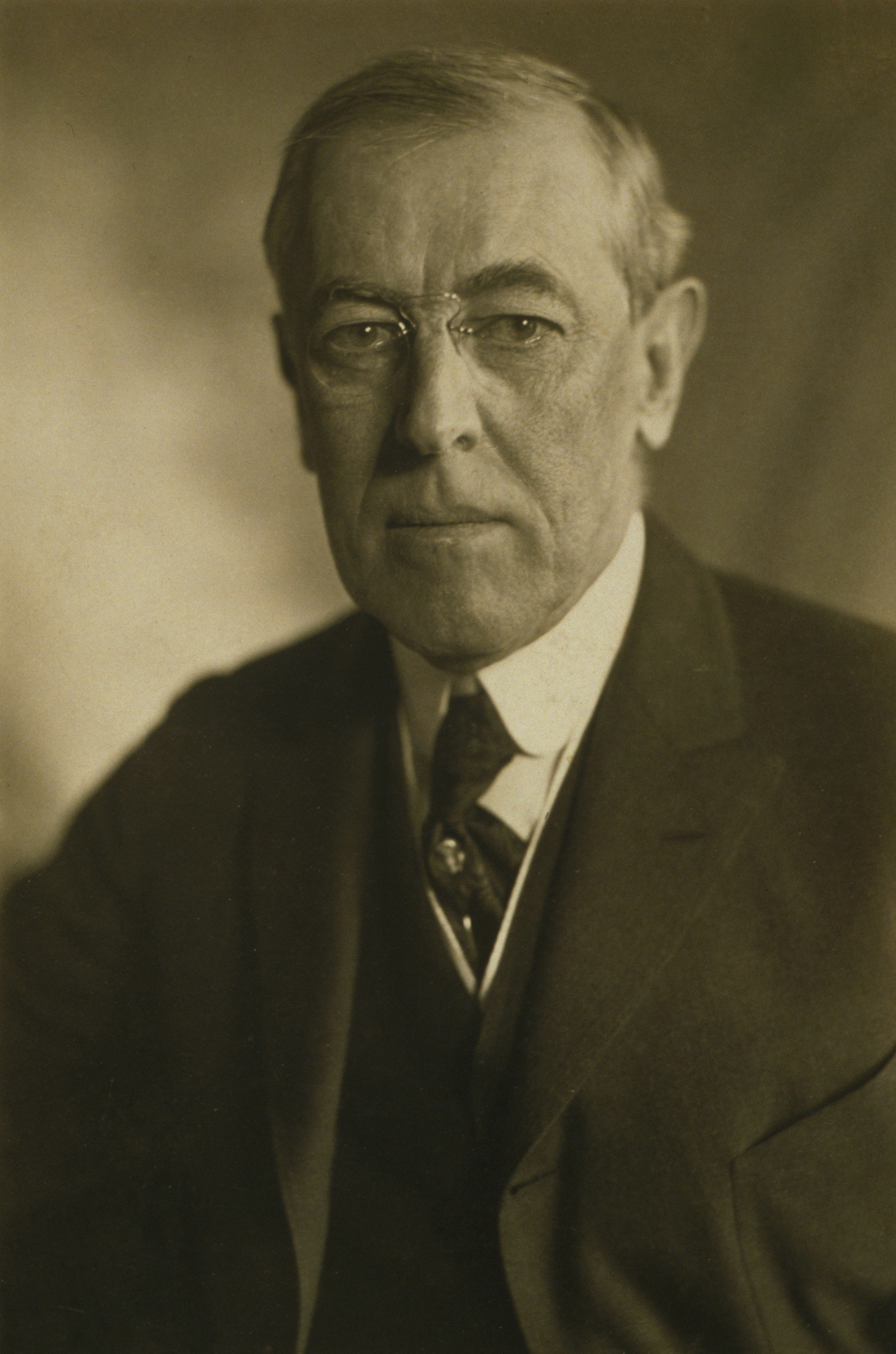
Woodrow Wilson, President of the United States

- Woodrow Wilson – President of the United States
- Thomas R. Marshall – Vice President of the United States
- Newton D. Baker – Secretary of War
- Josephus Daniels – Secretary of the Navy
- Tasker H. Bliss – Chief of Staff of the U.S. Army (1917–1918)
- Peyton C. March – Chief of Staff of the U.S. Army (1918)
- John J. Pershing – Commander of the American Expeditionary Forces
- William Sims – Commander of all American naval forces in Europe
- Hunter Liggett – Commander of the I Corps (1917–1918) and the First American Army (1918)
- Robert Lee Bullard – Commander of the Second American Army (1918)

== Empire of Japan ==
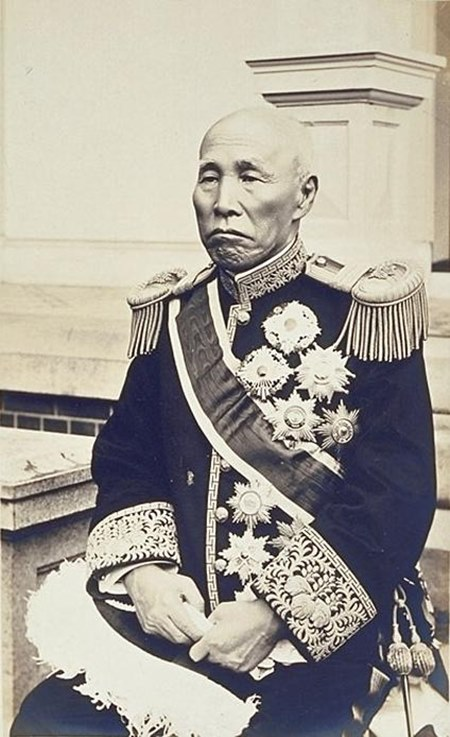
Okuma Shigenobu, 5th Prime Minister of Japan.

- Yoshihito – Emperor of Japan
- Okuma Shigenobu – Prime Minister of Japan (1914–1916)
- Terauchi Masatake – Prime Minister of Japan (1916–1918)
- Hara Takashi – Prime Minister of Japan (1918–1921)
- Kamio Mitsuomi – Commander of the Army during the Siege of Tsingtao
- Kato Sadakichi – Commander of the Second Fleet during the Siege of Tsingtao
- Kōzō Satō – Commander of the Second Special Task Fleet in the Mediterranean

== Republic of China ==
- Yuan Shikai – President of the Republic of China (1916)
- Li Yuanhong – President of the Republic of China (1916–1917)
- Feng Guozhang – President of the Republic of China (1917–1918)
- Duan Qirui – Premier of the Republic of China

== Kingdom of Greece ==
- Constantine I – King of Greece (1913–1917)
- Alexander of Greece – King of Greece (1917–1920)
- Eleftherios Venizelos – Prime Minister of Greece
- Panagiotis Danglis – Commander-in-Chief of Greek forces on the Macedonian front
- Emmanouil Zymvrakakis – Commanded the first Greek units on the Macedonian front and commanded the Greek forces in the Battle of Skra-di-Legen
- Leonidas Paraskevopoulos – Commander of the I Army Corps (1917–1918)
- Pavlos Kountouriotis – Minister of the Navy

== Kingdom of Hejaz ==
- Hussein bin Ali – King of Hejaz, Sharif of Mecca and leader of the Arab Revolt
- Faisal bin Hussein – Commander of the Northern Arab Army
- Abdullah bin Hussein – Commander of the Eastern Arab Army
- Ali bin Hussein – Commander of the Southern Arab Army
- T. E. Lawrence – British Officer in the Arab Revolt

== First Portuguese Republic ==
- Bernardino Machado – President of Portugal (1915–1917)
- Sidónio Pais – President of Portugal (1917–1918). Prior to this, he seized power in a coup d'état in December 1917 and proclaimed himself President of the Revolutionary Junta (1917). Later appointed himself as Prime Minister of Portugal, and simultaneously held the posts of Minister of War and Minister of Foreign Affairs (1917–1918) before being elected President
- Afonso Costa – Prime Minister of Portugal (1915–1916, 1917) upon entry into war
- António José de Almeida – Prime Minister of Portugal (1916–1917) and Minister of the Colonies (1916–1917)
- José Norton de Matos – Minister of War (1915–1917)
- Vítor Hugo de Azevedo Coutinho – Minister of the Navy (1915–1917)
- José António Arantes Pedroso – Minister of the Navy (1917)
- Antonio Aresta Branco – Minister of the Navy (1917–1918)
- José Carlos da Maia – Minister of the Navy (1918)
- João do Canto e Castro – Minister of the Navy (1918)
- Ernesto de Vilhena – Minister of the Colonies (1917)
- João Tamagnini Barbosa – Minister of the Colonies (1917–1918)
- Fernando Tamagnini de Abreu e Silva – Commander-in-Chief of the Portuguese Expeditionary Corps (1917–1918)
- Tomás António Garcia Rosado – Commander-in-Chief of the Portuguese Expeditionary Corps (1918)
- José Augusto Alves Roçadas – Commander of the Portuguese Forces in the South West Africa Campaign
- José César Ferreira Gil – Commander of the Portuguese Forces in the East African Campaign
- António Egas Moniz – Minister of Foreign Affairs (1918), later led the Portuguese delegation at the Paris Peace Conference

== Kingdom of Siam ==
- Vajiravudh – King of Siam
- Chaophraya Bodindechanuchit – Minister of Defence
- Chakrabongse Bhuvanath – Supreme Commander of the Siamese Expeditionary Forces in World War I
- Phraya Thephatsadin – Commander of the Siamese Expeditionary Forces in the Western Front

== Emirate of Nejd and Hasa ==
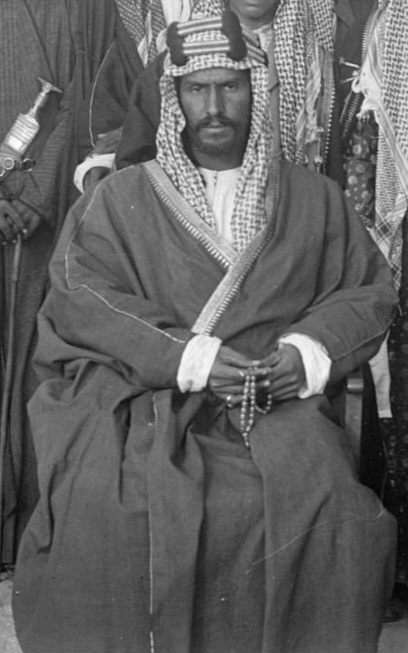
Ibn Saud, Emir of Nejd and Hasa

- Ibn Saud – Emir of Nejd and Hasa
- William Shakespear – British Military Advisor to Emirate of Nejd and Hasa

== First Brazilian Republic ==
- Venceslau Brás – President of Brazil
- Caetano de Faria – Minister of War (1914–1918)
- Alexandrino de Alencar – Minister of the Navy (1913–1918)
- Pedro de Frontin – Admiral and Commander of the Brazilian Naval Division (DNOG)
- Napoleão Aché – General and commander of the Brazilian Military Mission in France, also known as Aché Mission
- Nabuco Gouveia – Chief of the Brazilian Medical Delegation
