= List of heads of the military of Imperial Russia =

This article presents the heads of the military departments of the Russian Empire.

== College of War ==
The Russian College of War (or War Collegium) was created in the course of Government reform of Peter the Great 11 December 1717.

=== Presidents ===
- Prince Alexander Menshikov 1717–24
- Prince Anikita Repnin 1724–26
- Prince Mikhail Golitsyn 1728–30
- Prince Vasiliy Dolgorukov 1730–31
- Count Burkhard Christoph von Münnich 1732–41
- Prince Nikita Trubetskoy 1760–63
- Count Zakhar Chernyshev 1763–74
- Prince Grigory Potemkin 1774–91
- Count Nikolai Saltykov 1791–1802

== Ministry of Land Forces ==
Collegiums were replaced by Ministries as part of the Government reform of Alexander I.

- Count Sergey Vyazmitinov 8 September 1802 – 13 January 1808
- Count Aleksey Arakcheyev 13 January 1808 – 1 January 1810
- Prince Michael Andreas Barclay de Tolly 20 January 1810 – 24 August 1812
- Prince Aleksey Gorchakov 24 August 1812 – 12 December 1815 acting

== Ministry of War ==
On 17 December 1815 the Ministry of Land Forces was renamed to the Ministry of War.

- Count Pyotr Konovnitsyn 12 December 1815 – 6 May 1819
- Baron Pyotr Meller-Zakomelskiy 6 May 1819 – 14 March 1823
- Count Aleksandr Tatischev 14 March 1823 – 26 August 1827
- Prince Alexander Chernyshyov 26 August 1827 – 26 August 1852
- Prince Vasily Dolgorukov 26 August 1852 – 17 April 1856
- Nikolai Sukhozanet 17 April 1856 – 16 May 1861
- Count Dmitry Milyutin 16 May 1861 – 21 May 1881
- Pyotr Vannovsky 22 May 1881 – 1 January 1898
- Aleksey Kuropatkin 1 January 1898 – 7 February 1904
- Viktor Sakharov 11 March 1904 – 21 June 1905
- Aleksandr Roediger 21 June 1905 – 11 March 1909
- Vladimir Sukhomlinov 11 March 1909 – 13 June 1915
- Alexei Polivanov 13 June 1915 – 15 March 1916
- Dmitry Shuvayev 15 March 1916 – 3 January 1917
- Mikhail Belyaev 3 January 1917 – 28 February 1917
- Alexander Guchkov 1 March 1917 – 30 April 1917

== Ministry of Sea Forces ==
- Count Nikolay Mordvinov 8 September 1802 – 28 December 1802
- Pavel Chichagov 31 December 1802 – 28 November 1811
- Ivan de Traverse 28 November 1811 – 17 December 1815

== Ministry of the Navy ==
Flag of the Russian Minister of the Navy

On 17 December 1815 the Ministry of Sea Forces was renamed, becoming the Ministry of the Navy.

- Ivan de Traverse 17 December 1815 – 24 March 1828
- Anton Moller 24 March 1828 – 5 February 1836
- Prince Alexander Menshikov 5 February 1836 – 23 February 1855
- Baron Ferdinand von Wrangel 18 May 1855 – 27 July 1857
- Nikolay Metlin 27 July 1857 – 18 September 1860
- Nikolay Karlovich Krabbe 19 September 1860 – 3 January 1876
- Stepan Lesovskiy 12 January 1876 – 23 June 1880
- Aleksey Peschurov 23 June 1880 – 11 January 1882
- Ivan Shestakov 11 January 1882 – 21 November 1888
- Nikolay Chikhachyov 28 November 1888 – 13 July 1896
- Pyotr Tyrtov 13 July 1896 – 4 March 1903
- Theodor Avellan 10 March 1903 – 29 June 1905
- Aleksei Birilev 29 June 1905 – 11 January 1907
- Ivan Dikov 11 January 1907 – 8 January 1909
- Stepan Voevodskiy 8 January 1909 – 18 March 1911
- Ivan Grigorovich 19 March 1911 – 28 February 1917
- Alexander Guchkov 1 March 1917 – 30 April 1917

== See also ==
- List of heads of the military of post-imperial Russia
- Military history of the Russian Empire
- Council of Ministers of Russia
- Russian Provisional Government
