= Nikolai Yanushkevich =

Russian general (1868–1918)

- Николай Янушкевич
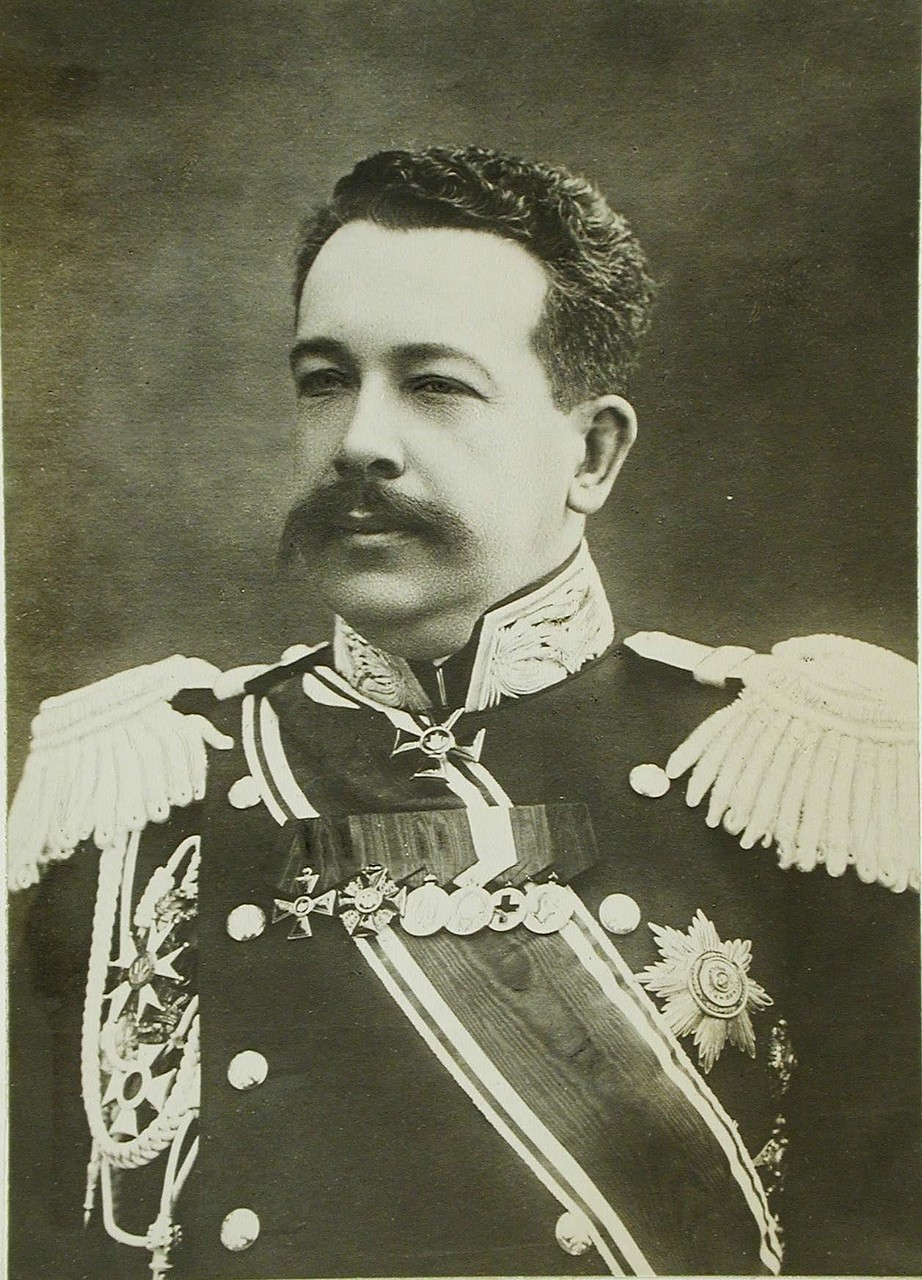

Chief of the General Staff
- In office 5 March 1914 – 1 August 1914
- Monarch: Nicholas II
- Preceded by: Yakov Zhilinsky
- Succeeded by: Mikhail Belyaev

Personal details
- Born: May 13, 1868
- Died: February 1918 (aged 49) near Oredezh station, Saint Petersburg Governorate, Russian SFSR

Military service
- Allegiance: Russia
- Branch/service: Russian Imperial Army
- Years of service: 1885–1918
- Rank: General
- Battles/wars: World War I

Nikolai Nikolayevich Yanushkevich (Russian: Никола́й Никола́евич Янушке́вич; 13 May [O.S. 1 May] 1868 – February 1918) was a Russian general who served as the chief of staff of the general headquarters (stavka) of the Imperial Russian Army from August 1914 to September 1915.

== Biography ==
A graduate of the Nikolaevskii Cadet Corp (1888) and Mikhailovskii Artillery School (1888), Yanushkevich was commissioned sub-lieutenant in the artillery of the Life Guards. He graduated from the Nikolaevskii General Staff Academy in 1896. Yanushkevich briefly served as a staff officer in the provinces before returning to the Life Guards as a company commander. From 1898 he served in a series of important administrative roles within the ministry of war, inc. Head of the Legislative Section of the Chancellery of the Minister of War (1905–1911) and Assistant Manager of the Chancellery of the Minister of War (1911–1913). Yanushkevich was appointed professor at the Nikolaevskii General Staff Academy (1910–1911) and became its head in 1913–14. He was appointed Chief of the General Staff in March 1914 and became Chief of Staff to the Supreme Commander in Chief, Grand Duke Nikolai Nikolaevich, at the outset of the war.

Yanushkevich was poorly qualified for the post of chief of staff. He had spent most of his career occupied by administrative duties in the Ministry of War. He had never held a field commission and his command experience was extremely limited, being confined to a short period as a company commander. Historian Norman Stone derisively describes Yanushkevich as a ‘clerk’.

The British military attaché to the Russian Army during the war claims that Yanushkevich owed his high position largely to his skills as a courtier and was rumoured to have found favour with the tsar when serving as a captain of the palace guard. Stone alternatively ascribes Yanushkevich's position to War Minister V.A. Sukhomlinov’s practice of appointing officers unlikely to threaten his own position, and only for a short period of time, to the post of Chief of the General Staff – ‘[He was]...chosen in the usual Sukhomlinov way to prevent anyone dangerous from taking over the job, and surviving in it from sheer force of characterlessness.’ Historian David R. Jones is less harsh in his assessment, pointing out that whatever his shortcomings Yanushkevich was a supply expert whose ideas were incorporated in the 1914 field regulations.

Yanushkevich apparently played only a minor role in the opening campaigns of the war. According to Stone both he and the Supreme Commander, Grand Duke Nikolai Nikolaevich, were mere figureheads—command of the Russian armies was effectively exercised by the ostensible third-in-command, Quartermaster-General Yu. N. Danilov, a close associate of Sukhomlinov. Danilov was supported by a staff of fifteen whereas Yanushkevich had a single adjutant and spent part of his time developing his taste for pornography. According to the Russian Minister of War Sukhomlinov in his memoirs he did not, all the briefing with through the hands of Nikolai Yanushkevich, his assistant. The deeply anti-Semitic Yanushkevich, however, played a leading role in the savage pogroms and deportations to Siberia of Jews, Muslims, and ethnic Germans that accompanied, but also preceded, the so-called "Great Retreat" of 1915.

Yanushkevich was dismissed from his post in September 1915 as Tsar Nicholas II took personal charge of the Russian armies, with M.V. Alekseev as his chief of staff. At the insistence of Grand Duke Nikolai Nikolaevich, Yanushkevich continued to serve as his chief of staff after the latter's dismissal as supreme commander and appointment to the post of Viceroy of the Caucasus.

Retired from active service after the February Revolution, at the start of 1918 Yanushkevich was arrested in Mogilev and sent to Petrograd but was killed by his guards en route.

== Honours and awards ==
- Order of Saint Stanislaus, 3rd class (1893); 2nd class (1902); 1st class (10 April 1911)
- Order of St. Anna, 3rd class (1898); 1st class (29 December 1913)
- Order of St. Vladimir, 4th class (1905); 3rd class (1907)
- Order of St. George, 4th class (23 September 1914)
