= Pyotr Averyanov =

Russian general (1867–1937)

- Пётр Аверьянов
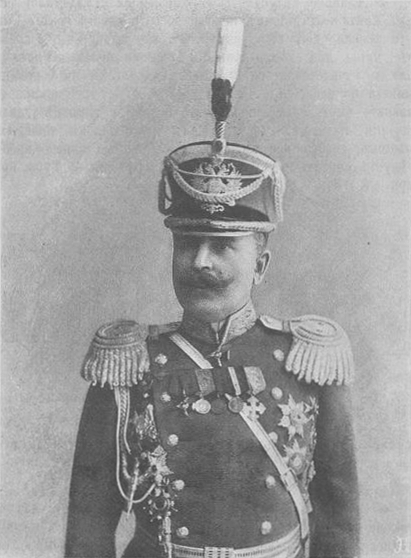

Chief of the General Staff
- In office 10 August 1916 – 15 May 1917
- Monarch: Nicholas II
- Preceded by: Mikhail Belyaev
- Succeeded by: Ivan Romanovsky

Personal details
- Born: October 5, 1867 Kargalinskaya station, Tver Governorate, Russian Empire
- Died: 13 October 1937 (aged 70) Belgrade, Yugoslavia
- Resting place: Belgrade New Cemetery
- Education: Tiflis Cadet Corps; Nikolayev Engineering School; Nikolayev General Staff Academy
- Awards: Order of St. Anna; Order of St. Vladimir; Order of Saint Stanislaus

Military service
- Allegiance: Russia
- Branch/service: Russian Imperial Army
- Years of service: 1885–1920
- Rank: Lieutenant general
- Battles/wars: World War I Russian Civil War

Pyotr Ivanovich Averyanov (Russian: Пётр Ива́нович Аверья́нов; 5 October 1867 – 13 October 1937) was a Russian general who served as the chief of staff of the general headquarters (stavka) of the Imperial Russian Army from August 1916 to May 1917.

== Biography ==
He entered the service in October 1885. In 1888 he graduated from the Nikolayev Engineering School. He was promoted to second lieutenant to the 1st Caucasian Engineer Battalion. In 1894 he graduated from the Nikolayev General Staff Academy as staff captain. He was stationed at the Petersburg Military District. From 1894 to 1898 he was Chief officer for assignments at the headquarters of the Caucasian Military District. In 1897 he was on a foreign mission, mostly at the Russian embassy in Turkey. In 1898-1900 he was chief officer for special assignments to the Commander of the Caucasus Military District. In 1898-1899 he served as censor of a company in the 4th Caucasus combat battalion. In 1900-1901 he served Staff officer for special assignments to the Commander of the Caucasus Military District. In 1901 to 1905 he served as secretary of the Russian Consulate General in Erzurum. In 1905-1906 he served as Chief of Staff of the Libau Fortress and from June 1906 to April 1908 he was clerk of the Main Directorate of the intelligence department of the General Staff. From April 1908 to June 1910 he was commander of the 16th Mingrelian Grenadier Regiment of the Caucasus Grenadier Division. In 1908 he travelled to Erzincan, collecting valuable information about the state of the Military of the Ottoman Empire, the mood among officers, and the policy of the Turkish government towards the Christian population of Asia Minor. From June 1910 to March 1914 he was the chief Quartermaster of the GUGSh. From March 1914 he was Chief of Staff of the Irkutsk Military District.

=== World War I ===
From November 1914 he was the acting Chief of the Mobilization Department of the Main Directorate of the General Staff. From August 1916 for the duration of the war, acting Chief of the General Staff. He organized a loan for Serbia in the amount of 60 million gold rubles. On 2 April 1917, during the purge of the apparatus of the Ministry of War, he was confirmed in the position, but on 15 May that year he was transferred to the disposal of the Minister of War. From that date he became Chief of Supplies of the Caucasian Front. In 1917 he was appointed General Commissar and Governor-in-Chief of the Turkish regions occupied by Russian troops during the war.

=== Later life ===
On May 14, 1918, he was appointed Chief of Supplies of the Caucasian Front and Assistant to the Chief of the Caucasian Military District. In 1918-1920, he was at the disposal of the Commander-in-Chief of the Volunteer Army, then the Armed Forces of South Russia. For some time, he replaced the Assistant to the Chief of the Military Directorate of the Armed Forces of South Russia, General V. E. Vyazmitinov. After the evacuation of the Russian Army from Crimea in 1920, he left for Turkey, and from there to Yugoslavia (Kingdom of Serbia), served in the garrison of the Serbian Army in Velika Gradista as a garrison commander, later taught at the Military Academy of the Kingdom of Yugoslavia, and retired in 1936. He died in Belgrade on October 13, 1937. He was buried at the New Cemetery. He published a number of essays.
