= Nikolai Kleigels =

Russian general and police officer (1850–1916)

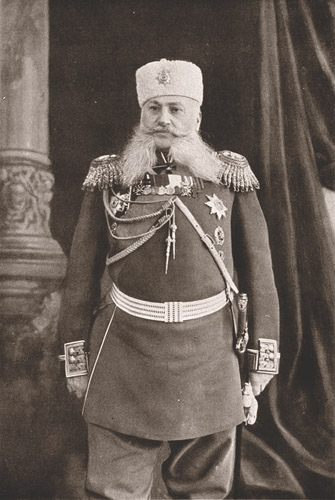
Nikolai Vasilyevich Kleigels

Nikolai Vasilyevich Kleigels (Clayhills) (Russian: Николай Васильевич Клейгельс, 25 November 1850 – 20 July 1916) was a Russian general, statesman, Adjutant-General, and also préfet de police of Saint Petersburg.

== Political career ==
As Prefect of the St. Petersburg Police, in 1901, Kleigels had led the police in disbanding student protests, which resulted in 62 dead students. Professor N. Belelubsky, of the Institute of Engineers, had written a public protest against Kleigels, which was published and read: "The events which took place in the Kazan Square represent the saddest and bitterest event in the life of the metropolis and of Russian society..." In 1902, Kleigels embezzled funds from the Fire Brigade of St. Petersburg, and avoided prosecution only because of the Tsar acting on his behavior against Lopoukine, the Public Prosecutor.

The only thing he is credited with that reflects positively on him, is that he allegedly discovered a bomb-making plot by revolutionaries working on a barge in one of the canals of Kiev. Normally, someone with this checkered history would be overlooked, but he had caught the eye of the tsar, who recommended him to everyone, and in 1903, he was nominated to the post of Governor-General of Kiev.

Kleigels was dismissed from his post as chief of police of Saint Petersburg in 1905, because it was believed that he allowed pogroms against Jews to go on, after a Jewish riot. During this event, Russian-Jewish citizens had torn down or otherwise attacked a statue of Tsar Nicholas I. When anti-Jewish pogroms sprung up, Kleigels simply had become "inactive" and had "abandoned his post," according to Sergei Witte, Prime Minister of Russia. Kleigels' response was considered insufficient, and he was replaced by General Karass. In addition to this, when the 1905 Russian Revolution deprived the government of all power, Kleigels had been forced to partially-collaborate with revolutionary forces, allowing the establishment of societies of labor and unions. Between these two accusations, inaction during a Jewish pogrom and collaboration during the 1905 Revolution, he had gone too far for the officials of the imperial court.

Kleigels had also tried to dissociate himself from the student movement, saying that he pitied them, and that he was surprised that so many people were influenced by a group of people who "attacked the police."
