= Ministry of War of the Russian Empire =

Administrative body in the Russian Empire (1802–1917)

Ministry of War
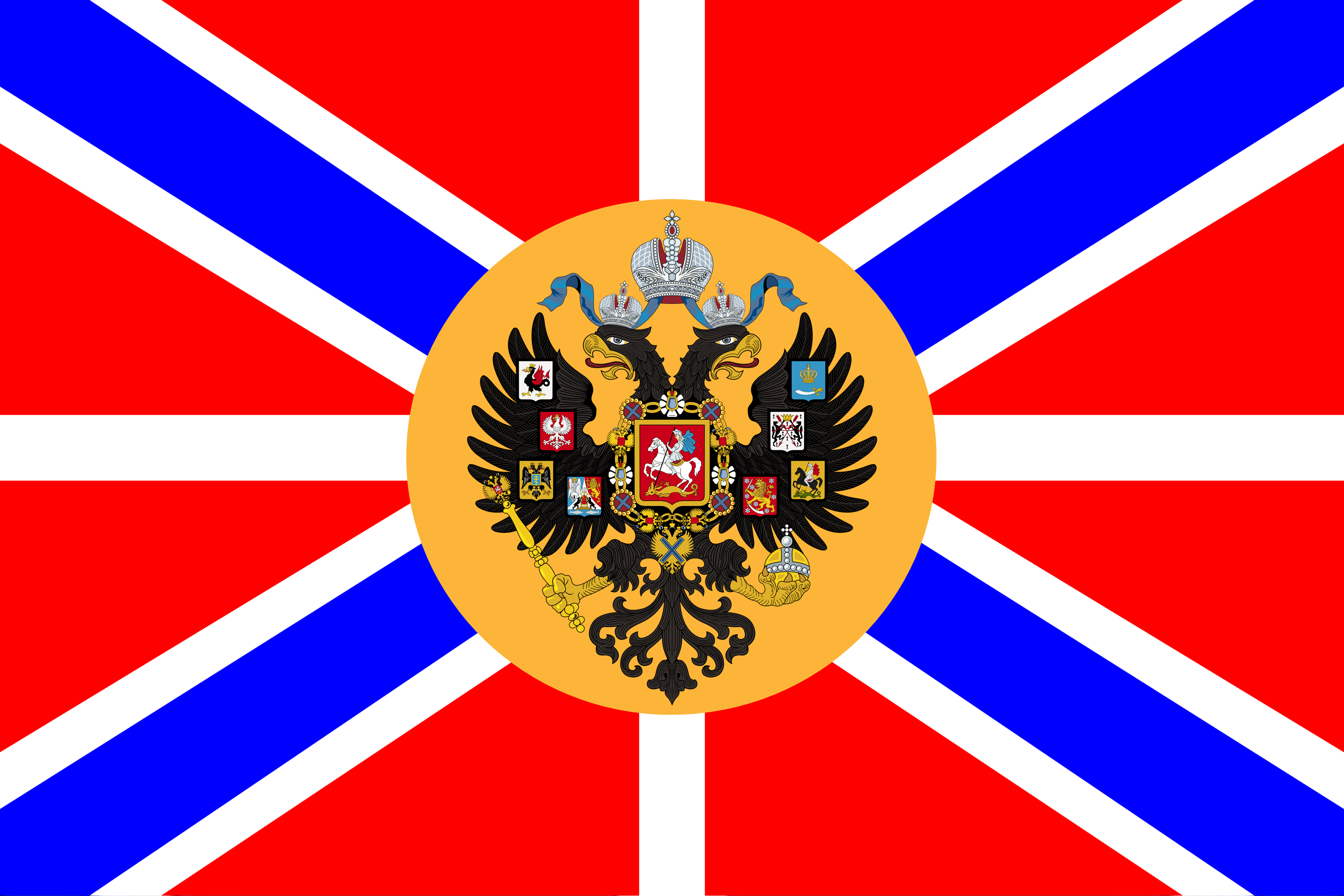

- Coat of Arms of the Russian Empire

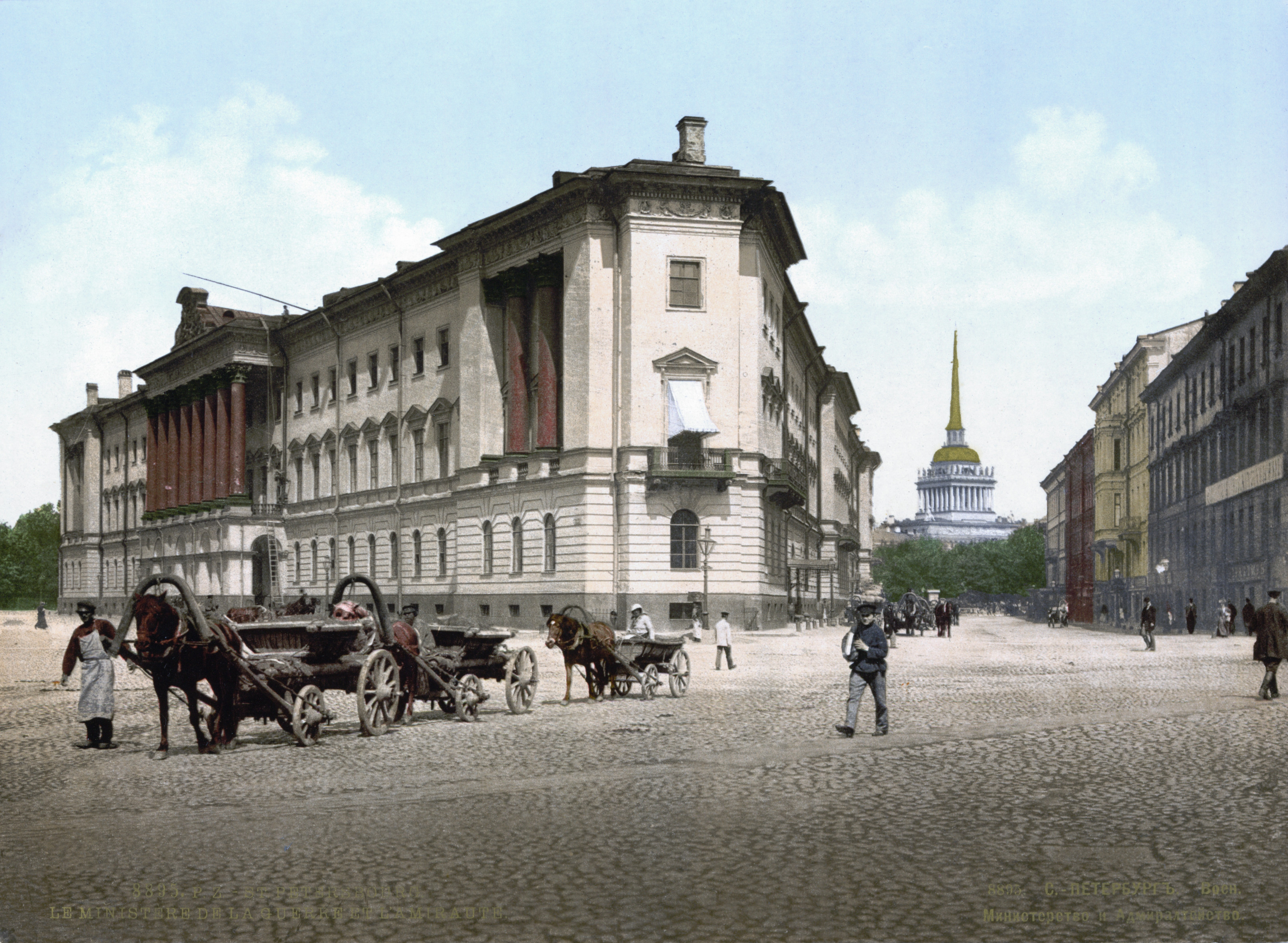
- Ministry of War offices at Lobanov-Rostovsky palace

Ministry overview
- Formed: 1802
- Preceding Ministry: College of War
- Dissolved: 1917
- Superseding Ministry: Council of People's Commissars on War and Navy Affairs (Soviet Russia)
- Jurisdiction: Emperor of All Russia
- Headquarters: Lobanov-Rostovsky Palace Saint Petersburg
- Ministry executive: Minister of War
- Parent Ministry: Council of Ministers of the Russian Empire

Ministry of War of the Russian Empire (Russian: Военное министерство, Military Ministry) was an administrative body in the Russian Empire from 1802 to 1917.

It was established in 1802 as the Ministry of ground armed forces (Russian: Министерство военно-сухопутных сил) taking over responsibilities from the College of War during the Government reform of Alexander I which led to the creation of ministries. It was renamed to the Ministry of War in 1815.

== Structure ==
On December 28, 1862, by order of the Minister of War No. 375, the Main Artillery Directorate (GAU) of the Ministry of War was established. The GAU supervised the supply of the army not only with artillery guns and ammunition, but also with small arms, and also supervised the combat training and staffing of artillery units. State-owned military factories were subordinate to it. It was headed by a General Feldzeugmeister, and in 1908 the position of Chief of the GAU was introduced.

At the end of the 19th century, the Ministry of War had following structure.

- Military Council
- War Ministry Chancellery
- Grand Staff - personal matters, organization, instruction and economy of the army
- His Imperial Majesty's Retinue
- Departments:
  - Commissariat Department
  - Artillery Department
  - Engineer (Military Technical) Department
  - Military Medical Department
  - Military Education Department
  - Military Justice Department
  - Department of Cossack Troops
- Committees
  - Committee on Military Codification - legislative questions
  - Committee on Military Sanitation

== Buildings ==
The Ministry was initially accommodated in Count Zakhar Chernyshyov's former palace on Moika River Embankment, which was bought by the State Treasury for the Military Collegium in 1795 (later it was rebuilt and transformed into the Mariinsky Palace).

In 1824, the mezzanine and the first floor of the Lobanov-Rostovsky Residence (12 Admiralteysky Avenue) were rented for the Ministry of War for 63,000 roubles a year. On 23 June 1828, the entire building was bought by the State Treasury for one million roubles, and in 1829-1830 it was renovated to meet the Ministry's needs. It housed the principal establishments of the Ministry until its dissolution in 1918. The main entrance is guarded by white marble Medici lions.

== Ministers ==
Minister of War
- Военный министр Российской империи
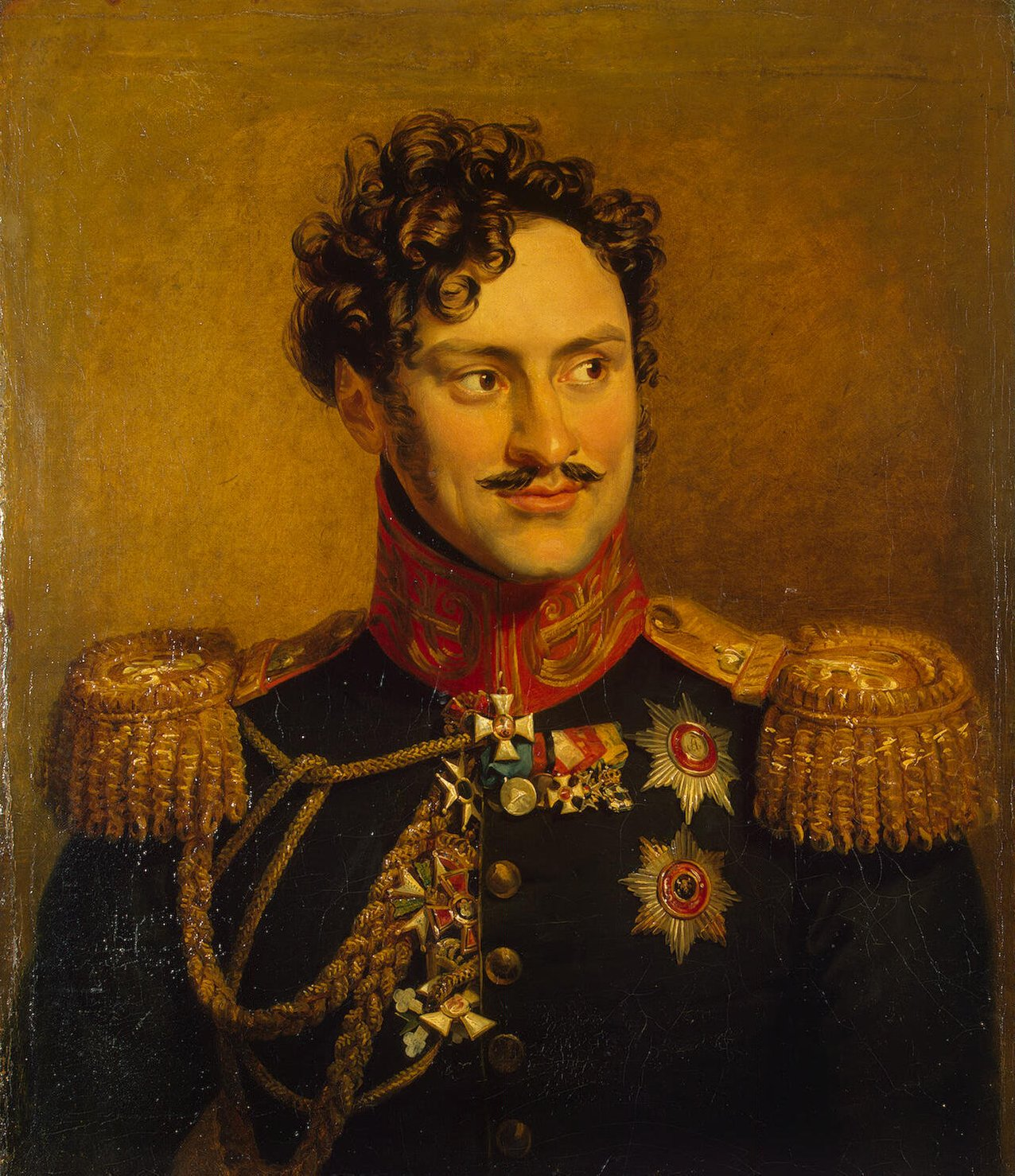
- Longest serving Prince Alexander Chernyshyov; 26 August 1827 – 26 August 1852
- Ministry of War
- Member of: Council of Ministers
- Reports to: Emperor of Russia
- Term length: Not fixed
- Precursor: President of College of War
- Formation: 8 September 1802
- First holder: Sergey Vyazmitinov
- Final holder: Alexander Guchkov
- Abolished: 30 April 1917
- Succession: Minister of Defence (Soviet Union)

=== Ministers of Land Forces ===
- Count Sergey Vyazmitinov 8 September 1802 – 13 January 1808
- Count Aleksey Arakcheyev 13 January 1808 – 1 January 1810
- Prince Michael Andreas Barclay de Tolly 20 January 1810 – 24 August 1812
- Prince Aleksey Gorchakov 24 August 1812 – 12 December 1815 acting

=== Ministers of War ===
- Count Pyotr Konovnitsyn 12 December 1815 – 6 May 1819
- Baron Pyotr Meller-Zakomelsky 6 May 1819 – 14 March 1823
- Count Aleksandr Tatischev 14 March 1823 – 26 August 1827
- Prince Alexander Chernyshyov 26 August 1827 – 26 August 1852
- Prince Vasily Dolgorukov 26 August 1852 – 17 April 1856
- Nikolay Sukhozanet 17 April 1856 – 16 May 1861
- Count Dmitry Milyutin 16 May 1861 – 21 May 1881
- Pyotr Vannovsky 22 May 1881 – 1 January 1898
- Aleksey Kuropatkin 1 January 1898 – 7 February 1904
- Viktor Sakharov 11 March 1904 – 21 June 1905
- Aleksandr Roediger 21 June 1905 – 11 March 1909
- Vladimir Sukhomlinov 11 March 1909 – 13 June 1915
- Alexei Polivanov 13 June 1915 – 15 March 1916
- Dmitry Shuvayev 15 March 1916 – 3 January 1917
- Mikhail Belyaev 3 January 1917 – 28 February 1917
- Alexander Guchkov 1 March 1917 – 30 April 1917.

== See also ==
- List of heads of the military of Imperial Russia
