= Mikhail Belyayev =

Russian general and war minister (1863–1918)

- Михаил Беляев
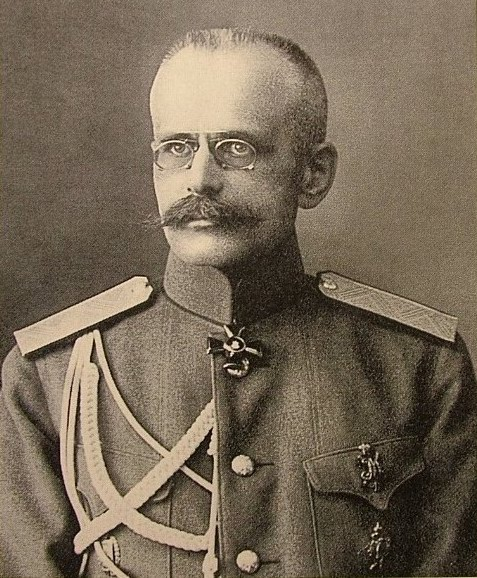

Minister of War of the Russian Empire
- In office 16 January – 12 March 1917
- Monarch: Nicholas II
- Prime Minister: Alexander Trepov; Nikolai Golitsyn
- Preceded by: Dmitry Shuvayev
- Succeeded by: Alexander Guchkov (Note: In the Russian Provisional Government)

Personal details
- Born: December 23, 1863 Saint Petersburg, Russian Empire
- Died: 1918 (aged 54–55) Petrograd, Russian SFSR

Military service
- Allegiance: Russian Empire
- Branch/service: Imperial Russian Army
- Years of service: 1885–1917
- Rank: General of the Infantry
- Commands: Chief of the General Staff
- Battles/wars: Russo-Japanese War; World War I
- Awards: see awards

Mikhail Alekseyevich Belyayev (Note: Russian: Михаи́л Алексе́евич Беля́ев; also sometimes spelled Belyaev.) (23 December 1863 – 1918) was a Russian general. During World War I he was the Chief of Staff of the Imperial Russian Army from 1914 to 1916 and the Minister of War of the Russian Empire in 1917.

== Family ==
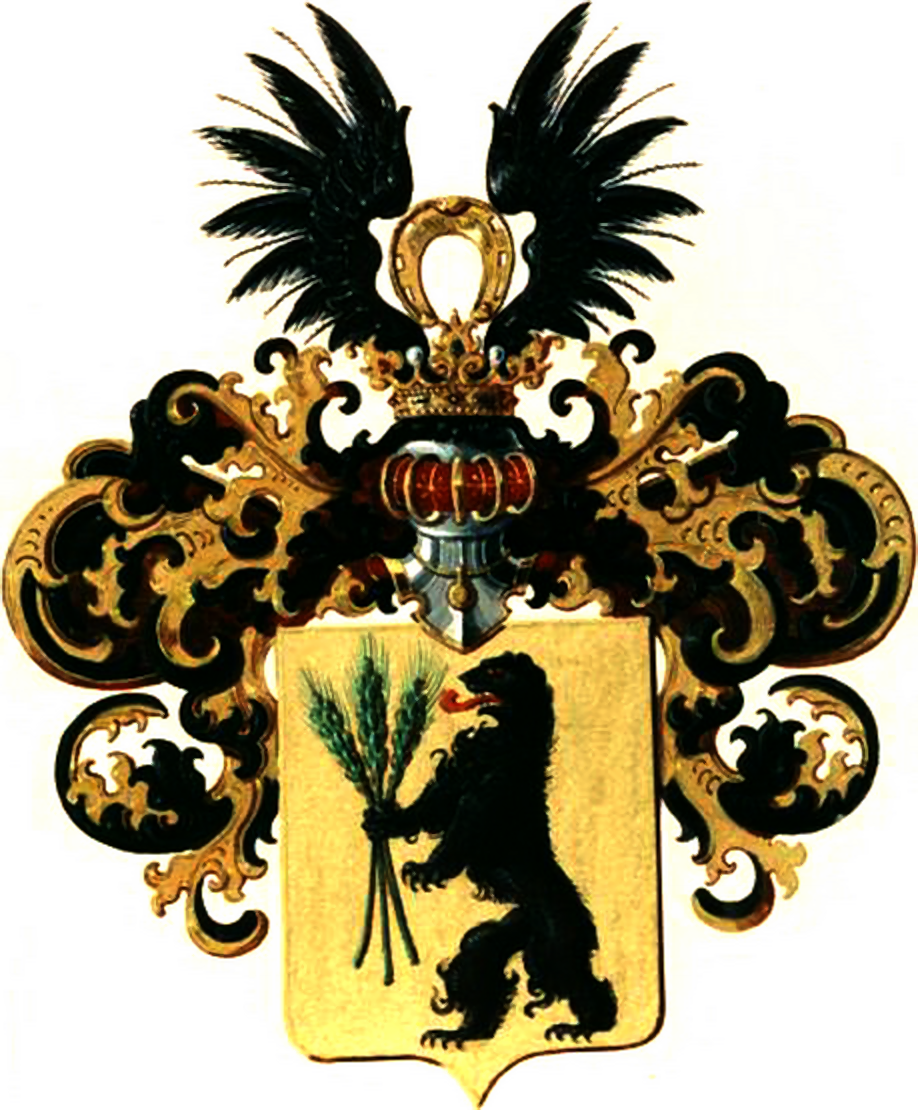
Coat of arms of the Belyaev family (ru)

The noble family of Belyaev had a rich military history, Notable members include Mikhail's cousin General Ivan Timofeevich Belyaev, the hero of the Chaco War, and Nikolai Timofeevich Belyaev, a participant in World War 1 and a scientist-metallurgist. One of his second cousins was the wife of Alexander Lvovich Blok, the father of the famous poet Alexander Alexandrovich Blok.

== Early life ==
=== Early life and military career ===
Belyayev was born in Saint Petersburg on December 23, 1863, to Lieutenant-General Aleksei Mikhailovich Belyaev. At an early age, he attended The Third Saint Petersburg Gymnasium. In 1885, he graduated from the Mikhailovsky Artillery School, after which he served in several military units and the Imperial Guards. He was promoted to lieutenant in August 1890. In 1893, after he graduated from the Nikolayev Academy of General Staff, he continued to serve in the Imperial Guards. In late November 1893, he was appointed the senior adjutant of the 24th Infantry Division of the 1st Army Corps. In January 1897, he was appointed Chief Officer for special assignments of the 18th Army Corps and Chief of Staff of the army corps in early December. He rose to lieutenant-colonel in early April 1898. From early December 1898, he served in the Military-Scientific Committee of the General Staff as a junior clerk, and rose to senior clerk in April 1901. He was also promoted to colonel in the same month. In May 1902, he again served in the Imperial Guards, this time commanding a battalion in the Izmaylovsky Lifeguard Regiment.

=== Russo-Japanese War ===
In 1904, Belyaev participated in the Russo-Japanese War. From February 1904, he was an officer in the headquarters for special assignments under head of the headquarters of the Viceroy of the Russian Far East, General Yakov Zhilinsky. In late November 1904, he became the Chief of the Chancery of the Field Staff of the 1st Manchurian Army. From mid August 1905 till the end of the war, he was the Chancery of the new commander-in-chief, the aged general Nikolai Linevich. For military distinctions, Belyaev was awarded the Gold Sword for Bravery.

After the war, he was promoted to major-general in April 1908. In March 1909, he became a member of the Main Serfdom Committee of the country. By the end of 1910, he became the head of the Division for the Establishment and Service of the Troops of the State Security Service. He was promoted to lieutenant-general in June 1912.

== World War I ==
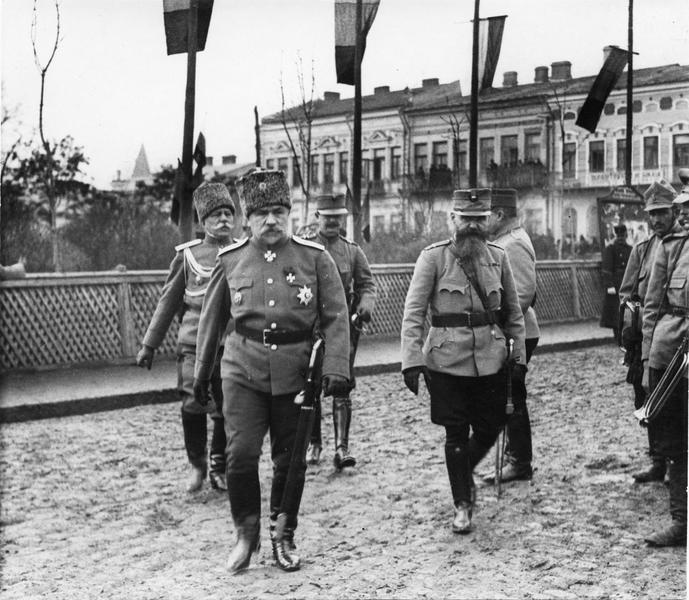
General Belyaev with general Sakharov in Romania, December 1916.

After the mobilisation of the Army, General Belyaev was promoted to General of the Infantry in early December. He was also appointed the Chief of the General Directorate of the General Staff in early August of that year, making him the highest-ranking officer in the Russian military. In late June 1915, he became an assistant to the Ministers of War, General Alexei Polivanov, he later became General Polivanov's chief of staff. But later in early August 1916, he was relieved from his post and became a member in the Military Council and a representative of the Russian command at the Romanian Main Apartment. And in early 1917, he replaced General Dmitry Shuvayev as Minister of War, becoming the last in the Russian Empire.

=== February Revolution ===
On February 23 (Julian calendar, the date in the Gregorian calendar was March 8) 1917, the February Revolution broke out. General Belyaev and district commander General Sergey Khabalov declared Petrograd to be in a stage of siege. He and General Khabalov attempted to suppress the Revolution, and he attempted to arrange the sending of military units from the front. The efforts to suppress the revolution failed due to large-scale mutinies among the soldiers under his command, including refusals to act against the revolutionaries and defections to the revolutionary forces.

After the revolutionaries captured Petrograd, General Belyaev was arrested and was put in custody in the Peter and Paul Fortress. He was soon released, but was rearrested in July, by order of the Provisional Government. After his rearrest, he was questioned by the Extraordinary Investigative Commission of the Provisional Government, but they failed to accuse the general of any crimes. He was released shortly after the October Revolution. He did not participate in public events after his release, but in 1918, he was arrested by the Cheka and was subsequently shot.

== Honours and awards ==
=== Russian Empire ===
- Order of St. Stanislaus, 3rd class (1895)
- Order of St. Anna, 3rd class (1899)
- Order of St. Anna, 2nd class with swords (1904)
- Order of St. Vladimir, 4th class with swords and a bow (1905)
- Gold Sword for Bravery (1907)
- Order of St. Vladimir, 3rd class (1907)
- Order of St. Stanislaus, 1st class (18.4.1910)
- Order of St. Anna, 1st class (6.12.1913)
- Order of St. Vladimir, 2nd class (1915)

=== Foreign ===
- Qajar dynasty:
  - Order of the Lion and the Sun

== Notes ==
Political offices
Preceded by Dmitry Shuvayev	Minister of War; 3 January 1917 – 28 February 1917	Succeeded by Alexander Guchkov
Military offices
Preceded by Nikolai Yanushkevich	Chief of the General Staff; 1 August 1914 – 10 August 1916	Succeeded by Pyotr Averyanov
