= Vladimir Sukhomlinov =

Russian general (1848–1926)

- Владимир Сухомлинов
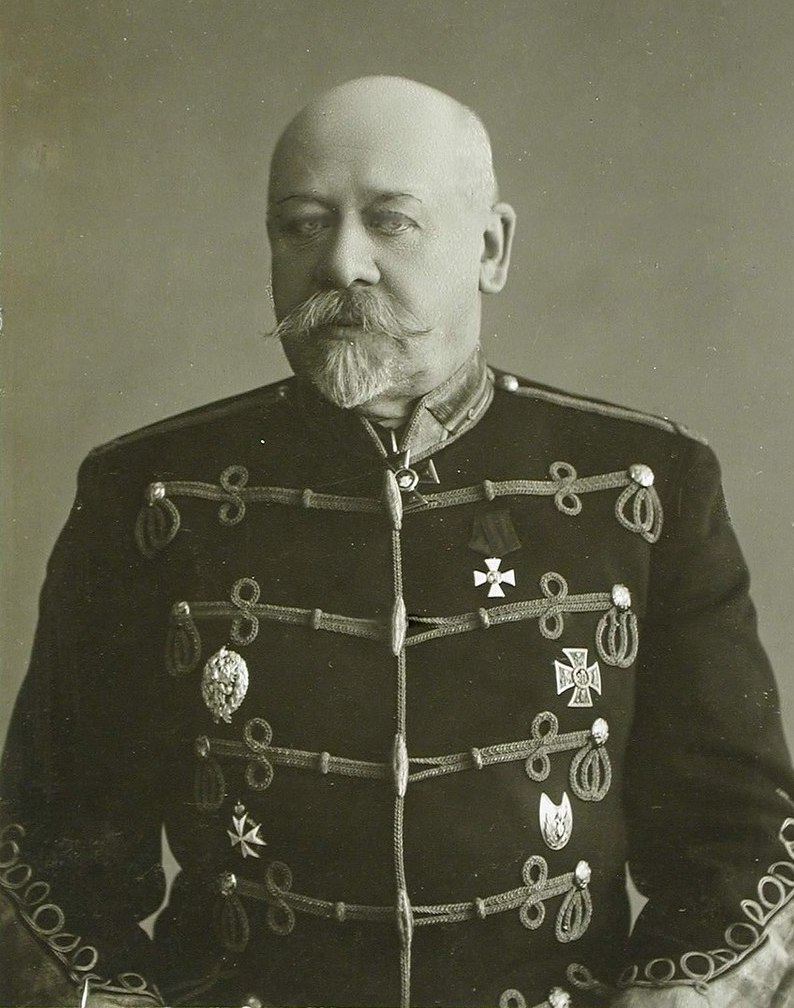
- Sukhomlinov in 1915

12th Minister of War of the Russian Empire
- In office 24 March 1909 – 24 June 1915
- Monarch: Nicholas II
- Prime Minister: Pyotr Stolypin; Vladimir Kokovtsov; Ivan Goremykin
- Preceded by: Aleksandr Roediger
- Succeeded by: Alexei Polivanov

2nd Chief of the General Directorate of the General Staff of the Russian Empire
- In office 15 December 1908 – 24 March 1909
- Monarch: Nicholas II
- Prime Minister: Pyotr Stolypin
- Minister of War: Aleksandr Roediger
- Preceded by: Fyodor Palitzin
- Succeeded by: Alexander Myshlayevsky

13th Commander of the Kiev Military District
- In office 1 November 1905 – 15 December 1908
- Monarch: Nicholas II
- Prime Minister: Sergei Witte; Ivan Goremykin; Pyotr Stolypin
- Chairman of the Committee of Ministers: Sergei Witte
- Preceded by: Nikolai Kleigels
- Succeeded by: Nikolay Ivanov

22nd Governor-General of Kiev, Podolia, and Volhynia General Governorate
- In office 1 November 1905 – 31 December 1908
- Monarch: Nicholas II
- Prime Minister: Sergei Witte; Ivan Goremykin; Pyotr Stolypin
- Chairman of the Committee of Ministers: Sergei Witte
- Preceded by: Nikolai Kleigels
- Succeeded by: Fyodor Trepov

5th Chief of Division of the 10th Cavalry Division
- In office 28 April 1897 – 6 June 1899
- Monarch: Nicholas II
- Minister of War: Pyotr Vannovsky; Aleksey Kuropatkin
- Preceded by: Alexander Maksimovich Rebinder
- Succeeded by: Georgy Karlovich Stackelberg

Personal details
- Born: 16 August [O.S. 4 August] 1848 Telshi, Litva-Vilna Governorate, Russian Empire
- Died: 2 February 1926 (aged 77) Berlin, Weimar Germany
- Education: Nikolayevskoye Cavalry School; General Staff Academy

Military service
- Allegiance: Russian Empire
- Branch/service: (Russian Empire) Imperial Russian Army
- Years of service: 1861—1915
- Rank: General of Cavalry
- Commands: 6th Dragoon Regiment; Officers' Cavalry School; 10th Cavalry Division; Kiev Military District
- Battles/wars: Russo-Turkish War
- Awards: See list

Vladimir Aleksandrovich Sukhomlinov (Russian: Владимир Александрович Сухомлинов, IPA: [sʊxɐˈmlʲinəf]; 16 August [O.S. 4 August] 1848 – 2 February 1926) was a Russian general in the Imperial Russian Army who served as the Chief of the General Staff from 1908 to 1909 and the Minister of War from 1909 to 1915.

Sukhomlinov was ousted as Minister of War amid allegations of failure to provide the Imperial Russian Army with necessary armaments and munitions for World War I and accused of responsibility for Russia's defeats in the early Eastern Front. Sukhomlinov was tried for high treason, corruption, and abuse of power in a high-profile case that damaged the reputation of Russia's fragile Imperial government. According to some historians, the Sukhomlinov scandal may have done more harm to the Romanov monarchy than the lurid scandals associated with Rasputin.

== Early life and military career ==
Vladimir Aleksandrovich Sukhomlinov was born on 16 August 1848 (O.S. 4 August 1848) in Telshi, Vilna Governorate, the son of Alexander Pavlovich Sukhomlinov and Olga Ivanovna Lunskaya. Sukhomlinov's younger brother, Nikolai Sukhomlinov, appointed the governor of Orenburg Governorate and the ataman of the Orenburg Cossack Army. Sukhomlinov graduated from Nikolayevskoye Cavalry School in 1867 and served in the Uhlans of the Imperial Guard Regiment based in Warsaw. Sukhomlinov graduated from the General Staff Academy in 1874 and participated in the Russo-Turkish War of 1877-1878, serving for some time on the staff of General Mikhail Skobelev and awarded the Order of St. George 4th class. After the Russo-Turkish War, Sukhomlinov joined the staff at the General Staff Academy on the invitation of its chief, General Mikhail Dragomirov, and lectured as well at the Nicholas Cavalry School, the Corps of Pages, and the Mikhail Artillery School. From 1884 to 1886, Sukhomlinov commanded the 6th Dragoon Regiment at Suwalki. Sukhomlinov served as Chief of the Officers' Cavalry School in St. Petersburg from 1886 until 1898, being promoted General in 1890. His next appointment was as Commander of the 10th Cavalry Division in Kharkov. In 1899, Sukhomlinov was appointed Chief of Staff of the Kiev Military District. In 1902, Sukhomlinov became a deputy commander of the Kiev Military District, and in 1904 became its commander. In this capacity he sought out Simeon Aisenstein, the pioneer of Radio, who at the time was a student at the University of Kiev. He encouraged official support for a major expansion of Aisenstein's work with the establishment of a series of experimental stations which were subsequently bought by the Ministry of War. In 1905, Sukhomlinov was appointed Governor General of Kiev, Podolia, and Volhynia. In December 1908, Sukhomlinov became head of General Staff.

== Minister of War ==
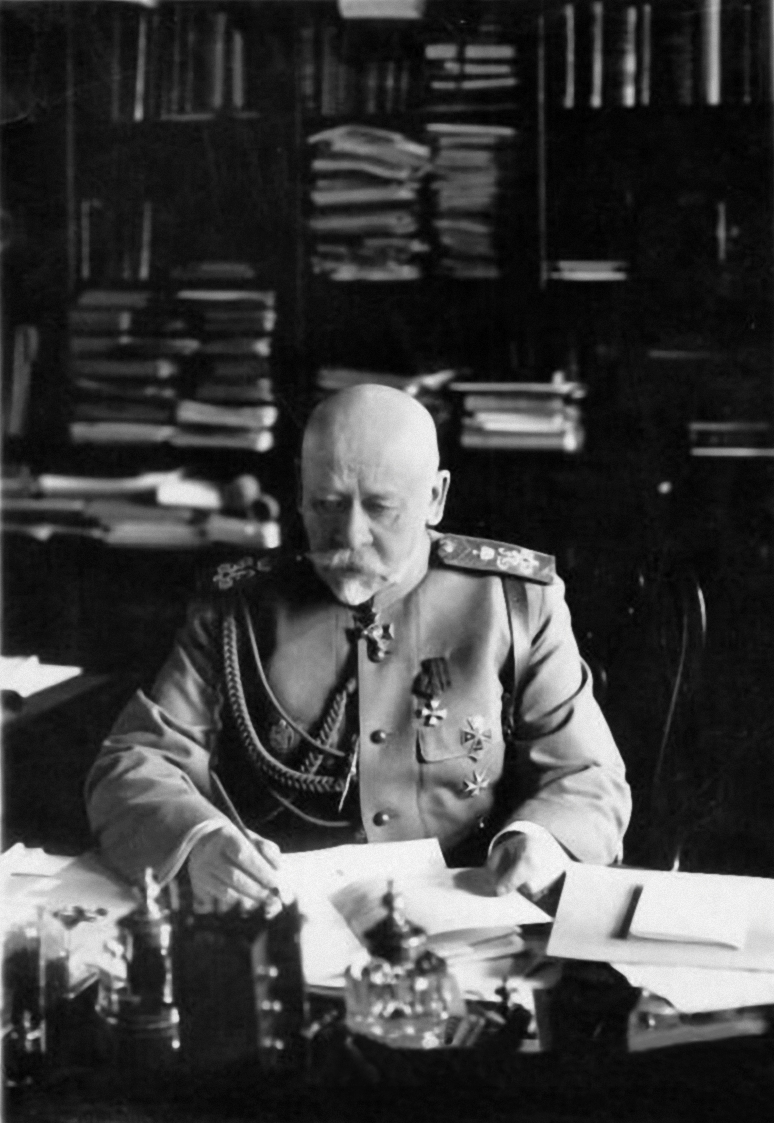
Sukhomlinov in his office during his time as War Minister (1912)

Sukhomlinov was appointed as Minister of War in March 1909, effectively placing him in charge of the Russian armed forces. In this position, Sukhomlinov opposed training innovations that would have placed emphasis on infantry firepower against the use of sabers, lances and bayonets; stating that "I have not read a military manual for the last twenty-five years". Sukhomlinov's personal charm and popularity with Tsar Nicholas II enabled him to survive accusations of lazy incompetence and dishonesty while in office. Sukhomlinov was standing next to Pyotr Stolypin, who had just resigned as Chairman of the Council of Ministers, when the latter was assassinated inside the Kiev Opera. Disagreement between the Minister and his assistant, General Alexei Polivanov, culminated in 1912 in the dismissal of Polivanov, and his replacement by General Vernander.

As Minister of War, Sukhomlinov was never trusted by the Army Committee of the State Duma, led by Alexander Guchkov, and it came to a duel. Sukhomlinov was resented by Grand Duke Nicholas Nikolaevich, the commander-in-chief of the Russian forces in the first phase of World War I. Sukhomlinov was not allowed to interfere with Minister of Foreign Affairs Sergey Sazonov, the Stavka, or Grand Duke Nicholas, and all the briefing went through the hands of his assistant, Nikolai Yanushkevich. Despite Sukhomlinov's reforms (or perhaps because of his inefficacy and resistance to change, as some assert), Russia suffered badly in the opening phase of the World War I. After several Russian defeats in East Prussia during the first months of war, on 11 June (O.S.) Sukhomlinov was forced out of office and succeeded by Alexei Polivanov. Sukhomlinov held Grand Duke Nicolas, Guchkov and Polivanov responsible for his downfall and went fishing in Saimaa near Imatra, writing articles under the pseudonym Ostap Bondarenko and studying the Russo-Turkish War (1787–92).

=== Perception ===
Maurice Paleologue, the last French ambassador to Imperial Russia, described Sukhomlinov as "intelligent, clever and cunning, obsequious towards the tsar and a friend of Rasputin—a man who has lost the habit of work—I know few men who inspire more distrust at first sight". Sukhomlinov has been considered responsible for Russia's military stagnation from 1905 to 1912, which resulted in the unpreparedness at the outbreak of World War I. On the other hand, in Bayonets Before Bullets, Bruce W. Menning asserts that "There was no doubt that he remained committed to building Russia's defensive and offensive military power. ... Thanks to Sukhomlinov's reforms, the peacetime strength of the Imperial Russian Army on the eve of World War I reached 1,423,000 officers and men." Though he has some criticism for the Minister, Menning credits him with simplifying and modernizing the structure of the Russian army corps, including the addition of a six aircraft detachment to each.

Norman Stone maintains that Sukhomlinov had "an extremely bad press" due to his autocratic style and accusations of corruption made by his enemies in the Imperial Duma and the army. The effect of the allegations against him is that "Sukhomlinov, as a sort of uniformed Rasputin, belongs to the demonology of 1917. But the case against him is far from watertight." Stone details his position as the leader of an informal group of "praetorians" in the high ranks of the army: professional soldiers, often from lower- and middle-class backgrounds, with experience in and loyalty to the infantry. As such, Sukhomlinov and his allies were opposed by what Stone calls the "patrician" faction, upper-class officers owing less of their status to military service, who tended to favor the cavalry and artillery (especially fortress artillery). Stone regards the continued standoff between the two factions as the responsibility of the Czar Nicholas, who played the two sides off against one another as a means of preserving his own freedom of action. In any case, Sukhomlinov did try, with some success, to direct resources away from the static fortifications which would prove less useful in the coming war, to the infantry and mobile artillery. Stone blames Sukhomlinov's failure to achieve more on problems of Russian development economics, and the resistance of the supposedly "technocratic" patrician faction.

== Imprisonment and death ==
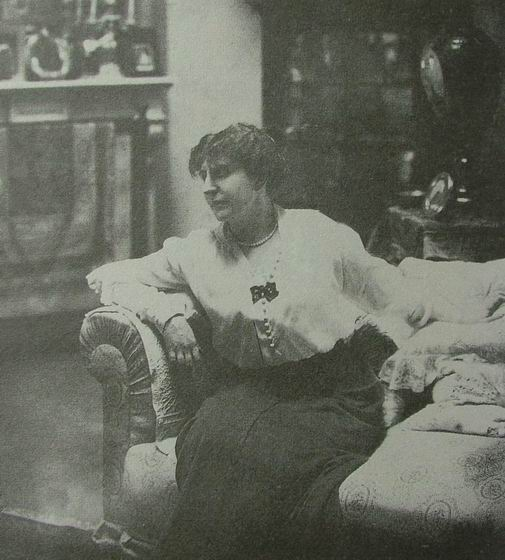
Sukhomlinov's wife, Madame E.V. Sukhomlinova, who was thirty years his junior, contacted Rasputin in order to get her husband released from prison. Photo by Karl Bulla

On 20 April 1916, the police searched Sukhomlinov's mansion and in the evening he was detained at the Peter and Paul Fortress. Sukhomlinov remained at the fortress until he was transferred to a hospital in July. Polivanov accused him of abuse of power, in relation with the divorce of his wife, corruption, depositing millions of rubles at the Deutsche Bank in Berlin, and high treason after some of his close associates had been convicted for espionage on behalf of Germany (c.q. S. Myasoedov, A. Altschuller, V. Dumbadze, who was allowed to see documents in order to write a biography). Myasoedov, having an affair with Sukhumlinov's wife at the time, was arrested in Kovno and tried in Warsaw by a military court on 17 March and hanged the next day. Responsibility for his being brought to trial was shared by Duke Mikhail Andronnikov, Alexander Guchkov, Alexander Khvostov and Alexander Alexandrovich Makarov. Sukhomlinov received a sentence of two years imprisonment.

The third wife of Sukhomlinov was accused of having very extravagant tastes for clothes and furs. Like Alexandra, she had organized a hospital for wounded soldiers. One evening she organized a donation party using the name of the Tsarina to attract people. According to Mikhail Rodzianko, Sukhomlinov's wife had sought assistance from Grigori Rasputin and Peter Badmayev. After Rasputin had spoken to the Tsarina, she defended Sukhomlinov until she and Alexander Protopopov had him freed after six months and placed under house arrest. When Protopopov visited the former minister at his apartment, he was heavily criticized in the Duma. It disgusted the public and injured the reputation of the government.

Sukhomlinov was rearrested during the February Revolution and locked up in the same cold and humid cell at Peter and Paul Fortress as two years before, in addition to his wife and Anna Vyrubova who were also imprisoned there. His trial took place from 10 August through 12 September 1917. While acquitted of charges of treason, Sukhomlinov was found guilty of not using his power in the past to organize weapons and ammunition for the army. Sukhomlinov was sentenced to an open-ended katorga (as a librarian, printer and sweeper) on charges of leaving the army unprepared for World War I. For the first time in Russian jurisprudence history, a public jury was used for a political trial, organized in a military concert hall. After the fall of the Russian Provisional Government, Sukhomlinov had in prison the company of all the former ministers, others were Alexei Khvostov, Purishkevich, and Stepan Petrovich Beletsky.

On May Day 1918, Sukhomlinov was released from prison shortly before reaching 70 years of age, and for a while kept himself hidden in an empty apartment. On 22 September, Sukhomlinov fled Russia and moved to Hanko in Finland (now independent from Russia) before moving again to Weimar Germany. In 1924, his memoirs appeared, dedicated to his former friends in the army and to Kaiser Wilhelm II of Germany, who considered reciprocating by dedicating his memoirs to Sukhomlinov. Highly critical of former colleagues, Sukhomlinov suggested that the Revolutions of 1917-1923 had occurred because the breakup of the League of the Three Emperors and the war prevented Russia and Germany from remaining united against liberal democracy. He added that monarchism could be restored if there were a rapprochement between Russia and Germany. Sukhomlinov's memoirs were published in translation by the newly-formed Soviet Union.

Sukhomlinov lived the remainder of his life in extreme poverty in Berlin, where he was found dead from exposure to cold on a park bench one morning on 2 February 1926. Sukhomlinov was buried at the Berlin-Tegel Russian Orthodox Cemetery.

== Works ==
- As a journalist under the pseudonym Ostap Bondarenko;
- Suchhomlinov, W.A. (1924) 'Erinnerungen'. Verlag von Reimar Hodbing. Berlin.

== Honours and awards ==
Russian Empire

- Knight of the Imperial Order of Saint Stanislaus, 3rd Class, 1875, 2nd Class with Swords, 1878; 1st Class, 1893
- Gold Sword for Bravery, 1878
- Knight of the Order of Saint George, 4th class, 1878
- Knight of the Imperial Order of Saint Prince Vladimir, 4th Class with Swords and Bow, 1879; 3rd Class, 1883; 2nd Class, 1903
- Knight of the Imperial Order of St. Anna, 2nd Class with Swords, 1879; 1st Class, 1896
- Knight of the Imperial Order of the White Eagle, 1905
- Knight of the Order of Saint Alexander Nevsky, 1 January 1910; with Diamond Signs, 21 February 1913
- Silver mark to commemorate the anniversary of the 1st Cadet Corps, 27 June 1907
- Insignia of the Russian Red Cross, 30 September 1908
- Medal in memory of the 100th anniversary of the 1812 War, 15 August 1912
- Medal in memory of the 300th anniversary of the Romanov dynasty, 21 February 1913
- Medal for his work on other than implementation of a general mobilization in 1914, 24 March 1915
- Medal to commemorate the 200th anniversary of the victory at Gangut, 28 April 1915

Foreign

- Principality of Montenegro: Montenegrin campaign medal for 1877-1878, 1878
- Principality of Romania:
  - Romanian Iron Cross "for crossing the Danube", 1879
  - Grand Cross of the Order of the Crown of Romania, 1914
- Principality of Bulgaria:
  - Commander of the Order of Saint Alexander, 1884; Grand Cross, 1911
  - Grand Cross of the Royal Order of Military Merit, 1903
- Kingdom of Prussia: Knight of the Order of the Red Eagle, 2nd Class, 20 January 1890; 1st Class, 20 January 1905; Grand Cross, 1913
- (Austrian Empire) (Kingdom of Hungary) Austria-Hungary: Grand Cross of the Imperial Austrian Order of Franz Joseph, 22 May 1891
- Belgium: Grand Cordon of the Order of Leopold, 30 January 1895
- Persian Empire: Order of the Lion and the Sun, 1st Class with Diamond Signs, 1903
- Emirate of Bukhara: Bukhara Order of the Iskander-Salis, 1909
- Denmark: Grand Cross of the Order of the Dannebrog, 1909
- Qing Dynasty: Order of the Double Dragon, Grade I Class III, 1911
- Empire of Japan: Grand Cordon of the Order of the Rising Sun, 1911
- French Third Republic: Grand Cross of the National Order of the Legion of Honour, November 1911
- Mongolia: Order of the Precious Rod of the 1st century, 1913
- Kingdom of Saxony: Albert Order, 1913
- Kingdom of Serbia: Grand Cross of the Order of the White Eagle

== See also ==
- Kornelij Šacillo: Delo polkovnika Mjasoedova, in: Voprosy istorii (Moskau) 4/1967, S. 103–116.
- Viktor Gilensen: Germanskaja voennaja razvedka protiv Rossii (1871–1917), in: Novaja i novejšaja istorija (Moskau) 2/1991, S. 153–177.

== Sources ==
- William C. Fuller, The Foe Within: Fantasies of Treason and the End of Imperial Russia, 2006. Ithaca, N.Y.: Cornell University Press.
- Alfred Knox. General V. A. Sukhomlinov. The Slavonic Review, Vol. 5, No. 13 (Jun., 1926), pp. 148–152.
- Meiden, G.W. van der (1991) Raspoetin en de val van het Tsarenrijk.
- Bruce Menning, Bayonets Before Bullets: The Imperial Russian Army, 1861–1914, Bloomington: Indian University Press, 1992 (ISBN 0253213800).
- Norman Stone, The Eastern Front 1914–1917, New York: Charles Scribner's Sons, 1975 (ISBN 0140267255).
- Vladimir G. Orloff, Underworld And Soviet, 1931

Preceded by Nicholas Kleigels	Governor-General of Southwestern Krai; 1905–1908	Succeeded by Feodor Feodorovich Trepov
Preceded by Aleksandr Roediger	Minister of War; 11 March 1909 – 11 June 1915	Succeeded by Alexei Polivanov
