= Alexander Guchkov =

Russian politician (1862–1936)

- Александр Гучков
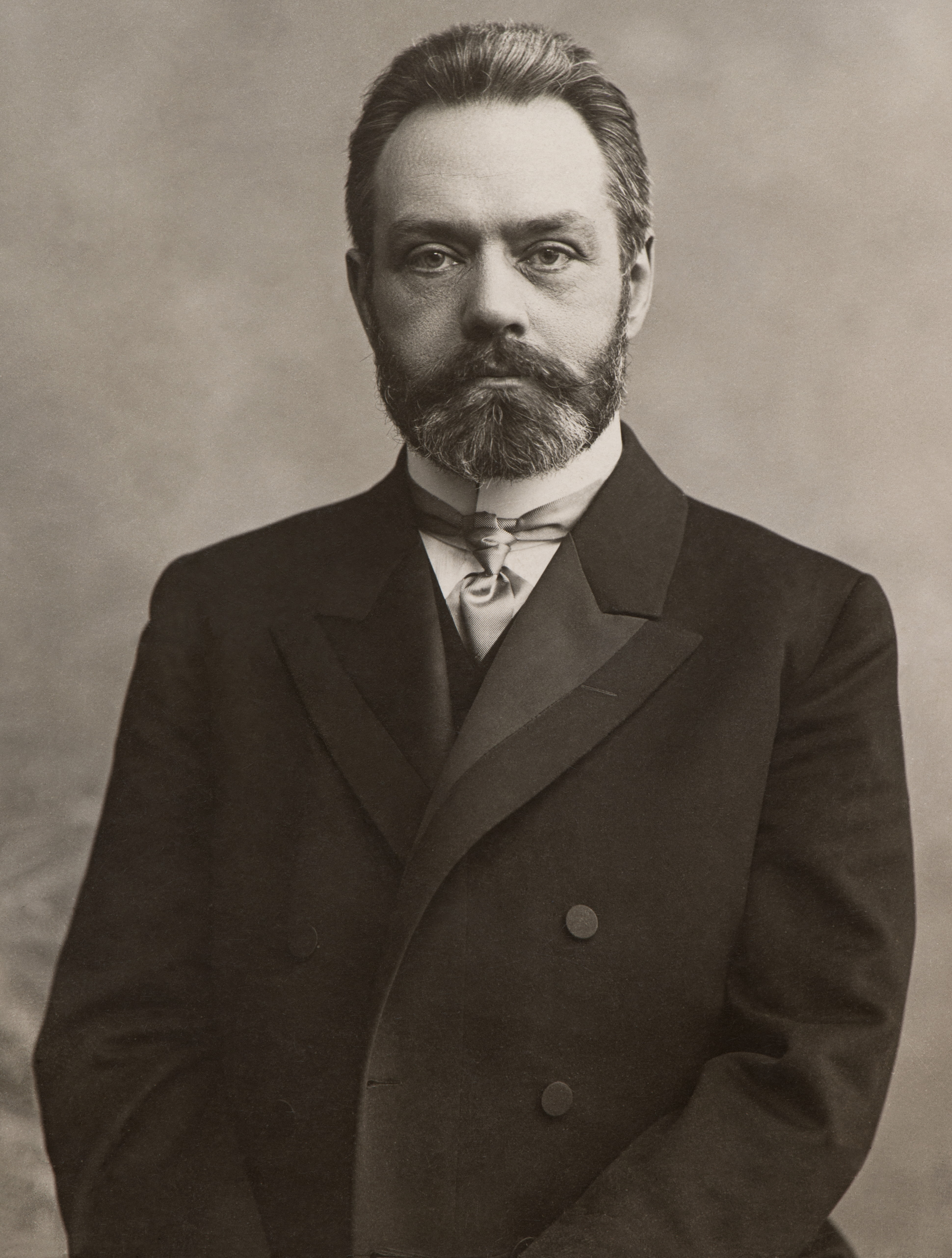
- Guchkov in 1917

4th Chairman of the State Duma
- In office 10 March 1910 – 15 March 1911
- Monarch: Nicholas II
- Prime Minister: Pyotr Stolypin
- Preceded by: Nikolay Khomyakov
- Succeeded by: Mikhail Rodzianko

Member of the State Duma
- In office 1 November 1907 – 9 June 1912
- Constituency: Moscow

Minister of War and Navy of the Russian Provisional Government
- In office 1 March 1917 – 30 April 1917
- Preceded by: Mikhail Belyaev
- Succeeded by: Alexander Kerensky

Personal details
- Born: 14 October 1862 Moscow, Russian Empire
- Died: 14 February 1936 (aged 73) Paris, France
- Party: Octobrist Party
- Education: Imperial Moscow University (1886)

Alexander Ivanovich Guchkov (Russian: Алекса́ндр Ива́нович Гучко́в; 14 October 1862 – 14 February 1936) was a Russian politician, Chairman of the Third Duma and Minister of War in the Russian Provisional Government.

== Early years ==
Alexander Guchkov was born in Moscow. Unlike most of the conservative politicians of that time, Guchkov did not belong to the Russian nobility. His father, the grandson of a peasant, was a factory owner of some means, whose family came from a stock of Old Believers who had acknowledged the authority of the Russian Orthodox Church while keeping their ancient ritual. His mother was French.

Guchkov studied history and humanities at the Moscow State University, and, after having gone through his military training in a grenadier regiment, left for Germany where he read political economy in Berlin under Schmoller. Academic studies were, however, not suited to his active and adventurous character. He gave them up and started travelling. He rode alone on horseback through Mongolia to western Siberia, and narrowly escaped being lynched by a mob.

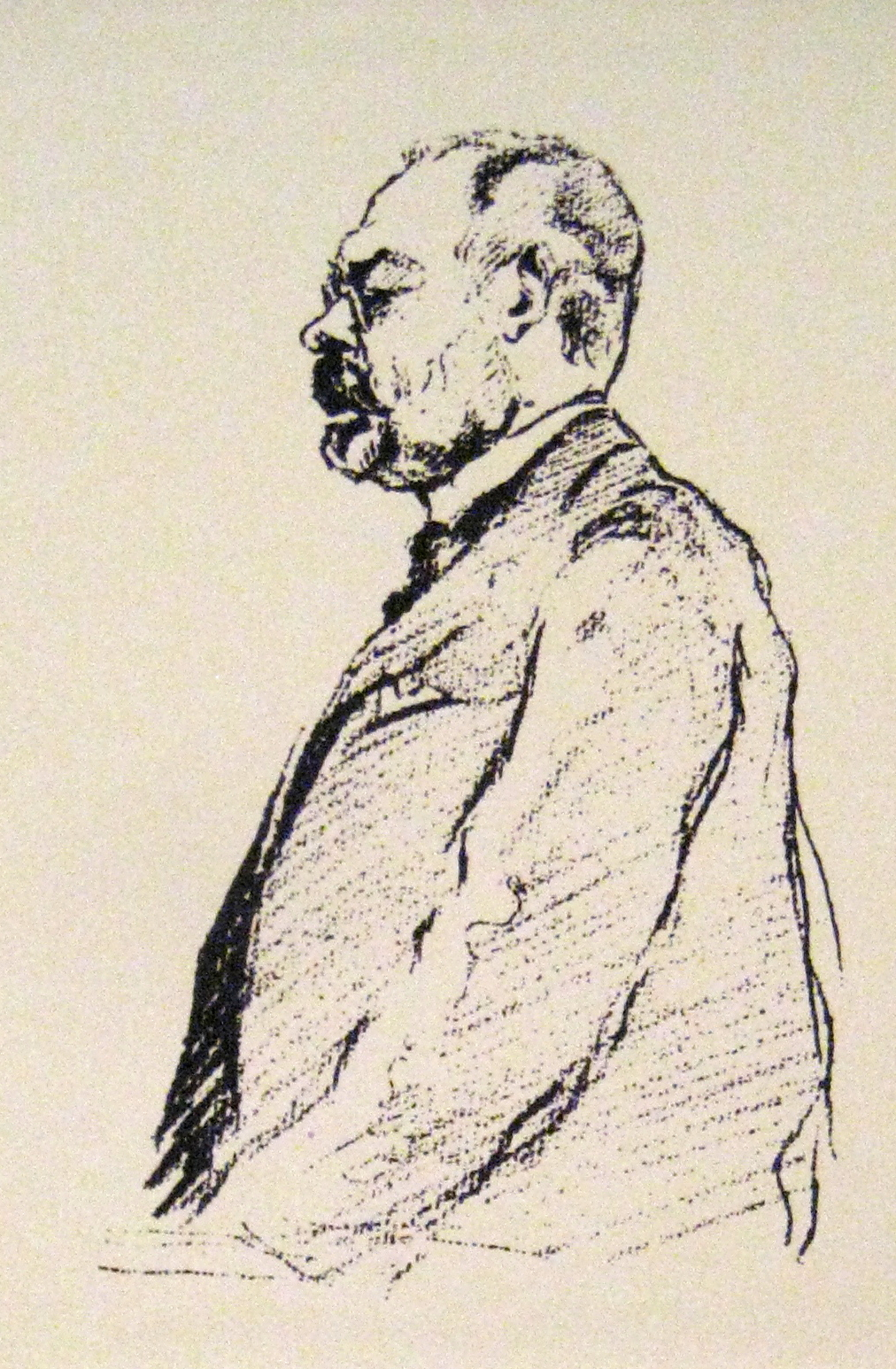
A.I. Guchkov

He became known for his hazardous acts, which also included volunteering for the Boer army in the Second Boer War under General Smuts, where he was wounded and taken prisoner. He also fought numerous duels.

He was elected by the Moscow municipal Duma to be a member of the executive (Uprava), and took active part in the self-government of the city. During the Russo-Japanese War, he served in the Red Cross and in the Municipal Union for the organisation of hospitals, and he was left to take care of the Russian wounded after the Battle of Mukden. When the Russian Revolution of 1905 developed, he took part in the meetings of Zemstvo representatives, but did not join the Cadets, whom he considered to be too doctrinaire and cosmopolitan.

Guchkov wanted military reforms, including the transfer of certain controls from the court to the Duma and the government. Under Sergei Witte he was appointed as Minister of Trade and Industry.

In October 1906, Guchkov became the head of the conservative liberal Union of 17 October. He had the hope that the Tsar's government would recognise the necessity of great reforms and work with the moderate liberals of the Zemstvos, while safeguarding the monarchical principle. The Tsar signed the October Manifesto. Pyotr Stolypin was for some time in sympathy with that agenda, and even contemplated the formation of a ministry strengthened by leaders of public opinion, of whom Guchkov, Count Heyden and N. Lvov would have been prominent members. When this project collapsed, Guchkov continued to support Stolypin.

Guchkov was Chairman of the Duma's Committee of Imperial Defence, which had a veto over the military budget. In 1908 he condemned the diplomats' decision not to go in war in 1908, when Austria annexed Bosnia and Hercegovina.

In the third Duma, elected on a restricted franchise, the Octobrists assumed the leading role. After Khomiakov's resignation in 1910, Guchkov was elected speaker. He attacked the "irresponsible influences" at the Russian court and the shortcomings of the Ministry of War in preparing for the inevitable conflict with Germany. As Stolypin became more and more violent and reactionary, the Octobrists lost their standing ground, and Guchkov eventually resigned the presidency of the Duma. He "lost faith in the possibility of peaceful evolution."

== Party crisis and World War I ==
In 1912 the Octobrists were defeated in elections to the fourth Duma, losing over 30 seats. Guchkov in particular was defeated in his constituency in Moscow. The remaining Octobrists in Duma split into two fractions and went into opposition. By 1915 many local party branches and the main party newspaper "Voice of Moscow" ceased to exist.

Guchkov is connected with publicising letters between Tsarina Alexandra and Rasputin. Grigori Rasputin's behavior was discussed in the Fourth Duma, and in March 1913 the Octobrists, led by Guchkov and President of the Duma, commissioned an investigation. Worried with the threat of a scandal, the Tsar asked Rasputin to leave for Siberia. Since Rasputin was attacked in the Duma, the Tsarina Alexandra hated him and suggested that Guchkov be hanged.

With the outbreak of World War I, Guchkov was put in charge of the Red Cross organisation on the German front, and it fell to him to search for the corpse of the unfortunate General of the Second Army, Alexander Samsonov. (This was eventually released to his wife by the Germans). He became friends with Alexei Polivanov. In June 1915 Vladimir Sukhomlinov left on charges of abuse of power and treason by Guchkov and Grand Duke Nicholas. In July 1915 Guchkov was elected chair of the Central War Industry Committee, an organisation formed by industrial magnates in order to supply the army. In August 1915 Guchkov was among the founders of Progressive Bloc, which demanded for establishing ministerial responsibility before the Duma. Nicholas II consistently refused to satisfy this demand. In October 1915 Guchkov became more revolutionary and involved in the preparations of a coup.

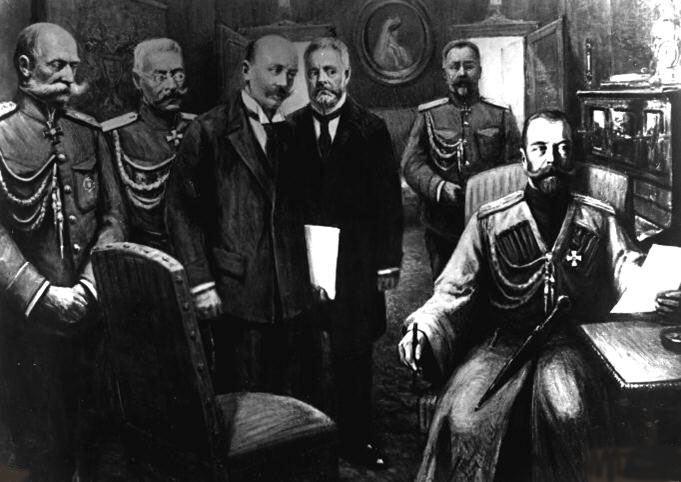
The abdication of Nicholas II. In the royal train: Minister of the Court Baron Vladimir Freedericksz, General Nikolai Ruzsky, V.V. Shulgin, A.I. Guchkov, Nicholas II. 2 March 1917, the State Historical Museum.

By August 1916 the word revolution was on people's lips. On 13 October Guchkov travelled to Kislovodsk because of his health. In December 1916 Guchkov came to the painful conclusion the situation could only improve when the Tsar was replaced. Guchkov reported that members of the Progressive Bloc would consider a coup d'etat to force the government to deal with the Duma.

When the February Revolution of 1917 broke out, Guchkov was prepared in to take charge of the Ministry of War and Navy. Shortly after the Petrograd riots in February 1917, Guchkov, along with Vasily Shulgin, came to the army headquarters near Pskov to persuade the Tsar to abdicate. On 2 March 1917 (Old Style) Nicholas II abdicated. In the evening Guchkov was at once arrested and threatened with execution by the workers.

== After the revolution ==
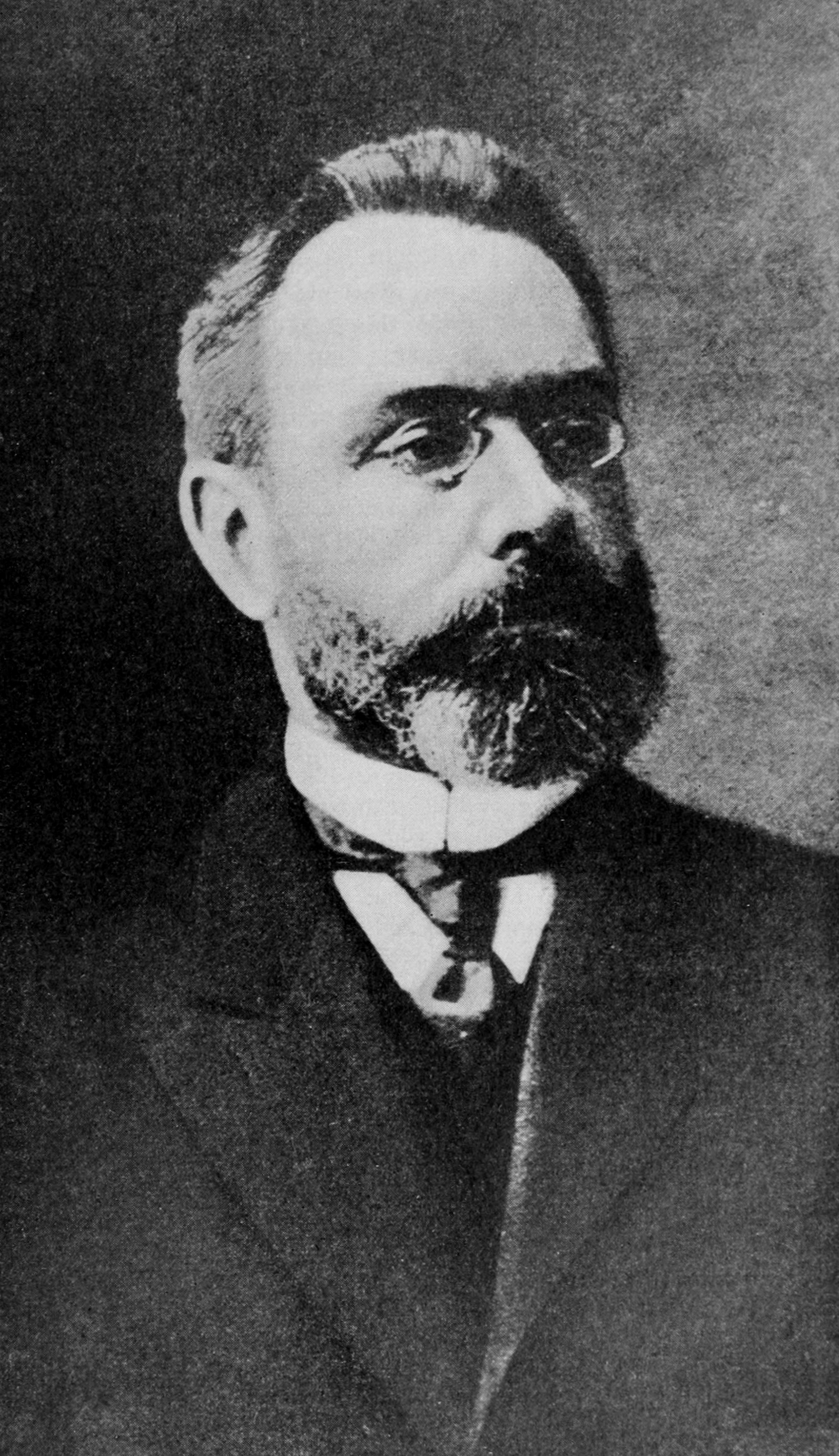
Alexander Guchkov, 1918.

After the February Revolution the Union of 17 October legally ceased to exist. Guchkov held the office of War Minister in the Russian Provisional Government until 29 April. He was forced to resign after public unrest, caused by Milyukov's Note. Along with his fellow Octobrist Mikhail Rodzianko he continued to struggle for the establishment of "strong government". He supported Lavr Kornilov and was arrested after the Kornilov Affair, but released the next day.

After the October Revolution Guchkov provided financial support for the White Guard. When the eventual defeat of the White Guard became inevitable, he emigrated, moving first to Germany.

In 1923, whilst living in Berlin, Guchkov hosted meetings of the "Eurasian Movement" over which the OGPU maintained covert control even after the fall of The Trust. Sergey Mikhailovich Spiegelglass, (Note: Sergei Mikhailovich Shpigelglas (Russian: Сергей Михайлович Шпигельглас; 1897–1941) who, as a member of the Cheka's Special Department (OO) (Russian: Особого отдела (OO)), headed its financial department (Russian: начальник сметного (финансового) отдела ОО ВЧК) and financed Richard Sorge's activities in Shanghai before Sorge left China on 12 November 1932. Sergey Spiegelglass is also transliterated as Spigelglas, Shpegelglas or Shpigelglas.) who had been a military counterintelligence Chekist (Russian: военная контрразведка) since January 1919, was the deputy head of the Foreign Division of the OGPU from 1936 to 1937. Spiegelglass stated "The Guchkov Circle had long worked with General Bredow who is the Chief of Military Intelligence of the German Army. When General Bredow was executed during the Röhm purge on 30 June 1934, his department and all its foreign networks came under control of the Gestapo." Spiegelglass added that the OGPU link with the Guchkov Circle was equally close, and that the OGPU agent in the very centre of the circle was General Nikolai Vladimirovich Skoblin.

Guchkov died on 14 February 1936 in Paris.

== Memoirs ==
- Alexander Ivanovich Guchkov rasskazyvaet—Vospominaniya predsedatelya Gosudarstvennoj dumy i voennogo ministra Vremennogo pravitel'stva, Moscow, TOO Red. zhurnala "Voprosy istorii", 1993, ISBN 5-86397-001-4, 143p.

== Personal life ==
Guchkov was an active member of the irregular freemasonic lodge, the Grand Orient of Russia's Peoples. Earlier he had been a member of a military masonic lodge.

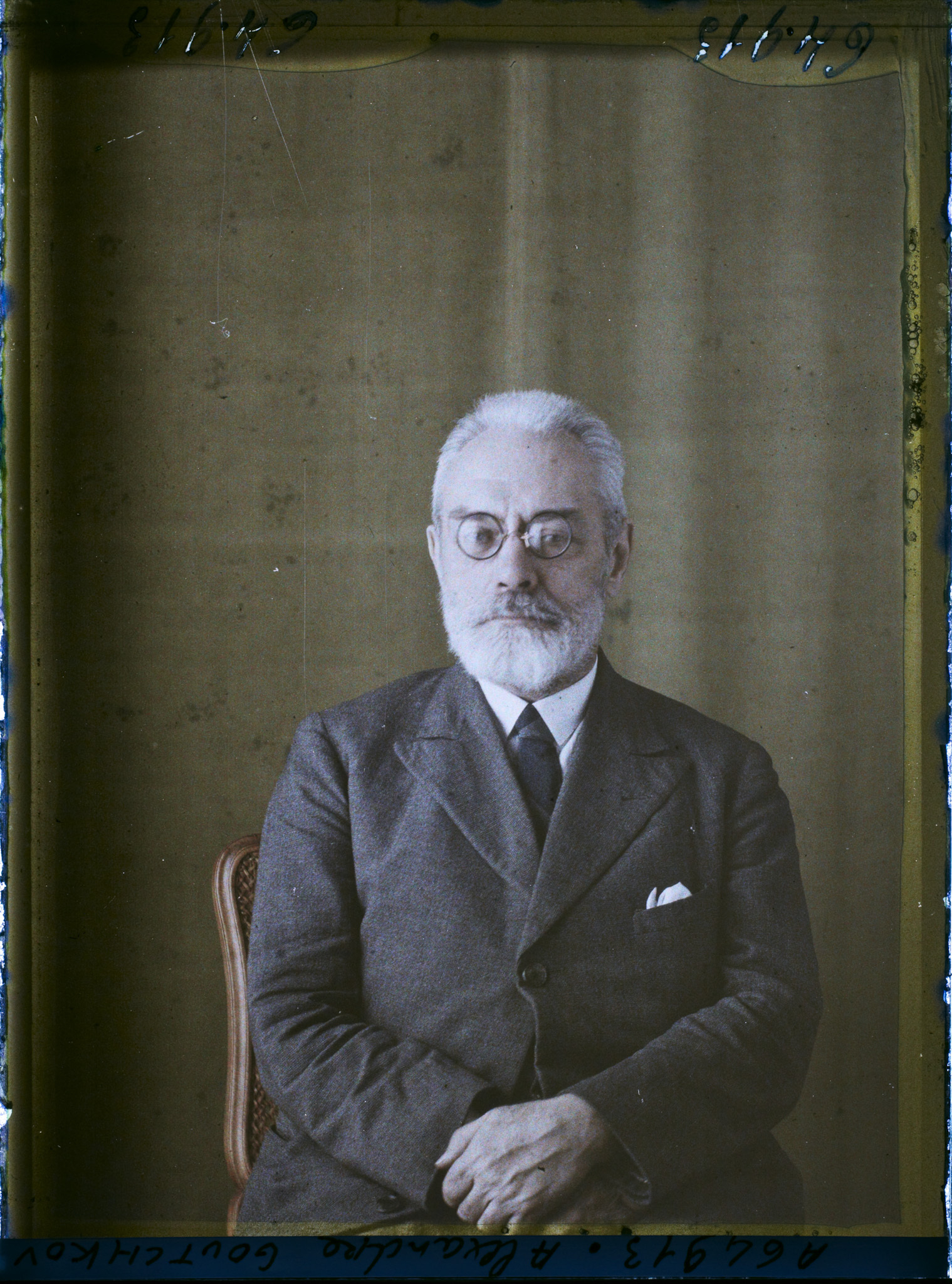
Autochrome portrait by Georges Chevalier, 1930

== See also ==
- Boer Foreign Volunteers

== Sources ==
- Alexander Sergeevich Senin. Alexander Ivanovich Guchkov, Moscow, Skriptoriy, 1996, 263p.
- William Ewing Gleason. Alexander Guchkov and the end of the Russian Empire, Philadelphia, American Philosophical Society, 1983, ISBN 0-87169-733-5, 90p.
