= Aleksandr Roediger =

Russo-German general

Alexander Roediger
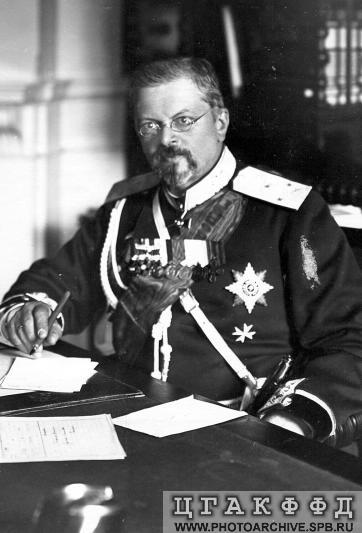

Russian Minister of War
- In office 15 July 1905 – 11 March 1909
- Monarch: Nicholas II
- Preceded by: Viktor Sakharov
- Succeeded by: Vladimir Sukhomlinov

Bulgarian Minister of War
- In office 19 September 1883 – 26 October 1883
- Monarch: Alexander I
- Preceded by: Alexander Kaulbars
- Succeeded by: Viktor Kotelnikov

Personal details
- Born: 12 January 1854 [O.S. 31 December 1853] Veliky Novgorod, Novgorod Governorate, Russian Empire
- Died: 26 January 1920 (aged 66) Sevastopol, Crimean ASSR, Russian SFSR
- Education: Nikolayev Academy of the General Staff

Military service
- Allegiance: Russian Empire
- Branch/service: Imperial Russian Army
- Years of service: 1870s–1917
- Rank: General of Infantry
- Battles/wars: Russo-Turkish War

Alexander Roediger (or Rödiger) (Russian: Алекса́ндр Фёдорович Ре́дигер, tr. Aleksándr Fyodorovich Rédiger; 12 January 1854 [O.S. 31 December 1853], in Veliky Novgorod, Novgorod Governorate, Russian Empire – 26 January 1920, in Sevastopol, Crimean ASSR, Russian SFSR) was a Russo-German General of Infantry who fought in the Russo-Turkish War of 1877–78, served as a member of the Imperial Russian State Council, and was the Minister of War of the Russian Empire (1905–1909). He also briefly served as the Minister of War of the Principality of Bulgaria (1883).

== Biography ==
=== Origin ===
Born on 12 January [O.S. 31 December 1853] 1854, Roediger was born into a German family of Philipp Friedrich Roediger and a Finland-Swedish noblewoman Elisabeth Charlotta von Schulmann, his father was a German who was working as a cadet school principal in Novgorod at the time of Alexander’s birth. His family was of Hessian origin.

== Career ==
Roediger graduate of the Page Corps and a student of the Nikolayev Academy of the General Staff; served in the Russo-Turkish War of 1877–1878; in 1882 was appointed Assistant Minister and later Minister of War of the newly independent Principality of Bulgaria; on his return to Russia became a Professor in the Nikolayev Military Academy. He was appointed Assistant Minister of War of Russia in 1898 under Aleksey Kuropatkin. Served as Russian Minister of War from 1905 through 1909 serving in the Witte, Goremykin and Stolypin governments. He was also an appointed member of the Imperial State Council beginning in 1905. In June 1907 police foiled a plot to assassinate Roediger. Several members of Socialist-Revolutionary Party were arrested.

Political offices
Preceded by Alexander von Kaulbars	Minister of War of Bulgaria; 19 September 1883 – 26 October 1883	Succeeded by Vikyor Kotelnikov
