= Dmitry Shuvayev =

Russian military leader (1854–1937)

- Дмитрий Шуваев
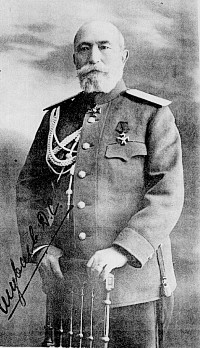

Minister of War of Russia
- In office 15 March 1916 – 3 January 1917
- Monarch: Nicholas II
- Preceded by: Alexei Polivanov
- Succeeded by: Mikhail Belyaev

Personal details
- Born: 24 October [O.S. 12 October] 1854 Ufa, Orenburg Governorate, Russian Empire
- Died: 19 December 1937 (aged 83) Lipetsk, Russian SFSR, Soviet Union
- Children: Aleksandr Shuvayev
- Education: General Staff Academy

Military service
- Allegiance: Russian Empire; Russian SFSR
- Branch/service: Imperial Russian Army; Red Army
- Years of service: 1872–1926
- Rank: General of the Infantry
- Battles/wars: World War I Russian Civil War
- Awards: Order of St. Vladimir; Order of the White Eagle; Order of St. Anna; Order of St. Stanislaus

Dmitry Savelyevich Shuvayev (Russian: Дмитрий Савельевич Шуваев; 24 October [O.S. 12 October] 1854 – 19 December 1937) was a Russian military leader, Infantry General (1912) and Minister of War (1916).

== Life ==
Dmitry Shuvayev graduated from Alexander Military School in 1872. Between 1873 and 1875, he participated in campaigns in Central Asia. He left General Staff Academy in 1878. In 1879, he became a professor at the military school in Kiev.

He used to command a division (1905) and a corps (1907-1908). In 1909, Shuvayev was appointed head of Chief Quartermaster Department and chief quartermaster. He then held a post of Chief Field Quartermaster between December 1915 and March 1916.

Shuvayev was appointed minister of war on 15 March 1916, succeeding Alexei Polivanov. In this role he supported with Mitrofan Voronkov and Vladimir Groman, was regards setting the fixed price for grain: Voronkov and Groman argued for fixing prices at a lower value, but the minister Aleksei Bobrinsky, a spokesperson for landed interest, at first succeeded in ensuring the prices were set quite high. However, when Shuvayev became involved, Bobrinsky's policy was overthrown and Voronkov became a much quoted spokesperson on the topic. On 3 January 1917 he was appointed to the State Council and succeeded by Mikhail Belyaev. After the October Revolution, Shuvayev served in the Red Army as a commander from 1918 to 1926 and taught at different military schools.

His son, Aleksandr Shuvayev, led the 4th Red Army in the Battle of Warsaw during the Polish–Soviet War.

He retired from military service in 1926. On 5 December 1937, Shuvayev was arrested by the NKVD. He was sentenced to death on 15 December and shot on 19 December 1937. He was rehabilitated posthumously in 1956.

== Honours and awards ==
- Order of St. Stanislaus, 1st class (1903), 2nd class with swords (1876), 3rd class with swords and bow (1874)
- Order of St. Anna, 1st class (1906), 2nd class (1881), 3rd class with swords and bow (1876), 4th class (1874)
- Order of St. Vladimir, 2nd class (5 September 1909), 3rd class (1890), 4th class (1885)
- Order of the White Eagle (25 March 1912)
