= Alexei Polivanov =

Russian military figure (1855–1920)

- Алексей Поливанов
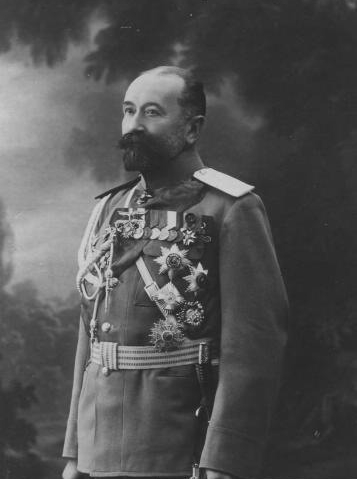
- Polivanov in 1915

Minister of War of the Russian Empire
- In office 13 June 1915 – 15 March 1916
- Monarch: Nicholas II
- Prime Minister: Ivan Goremykin; Boris Stürmer
- Preceded by: Vladimir Sukhomlinov
- Succeeded by: Dmitry Shuvayev

Assistant Minister of War
- In office 27 April 1906 – 7 May 1912
- Monarch: Nicholas II
- Prime Minister: Ivan Goremykin; Pyotr Stolypin; Vladimir Kokovtsov
- Minister of War: Alexander Roediger; Vladimir Sukhomlinov

Personal details
- Born: 16 March [O.S. 4 March] 1855 Krasnoye-na-Volge, Kostroma Governorate. Russian Empire
- Died: 25 September 1920 (aged 65) Riga, Latvia

Military service
- Allegiance: Russian Empire; Russian SFSR
- Branch/service: Imperial Russian Army; Red Army
- Years of service: 1871–1920
- Rank: General
- Battles/wars: Russo-Turkish War; Russo-Japanese War; World War I

Alexei Andreyevich Polivanov (Russian: Алексей Андреевич Поливанов); 16 March [O.S. 4 March] 1855 – 25 September 1920) was a Russian military figure, infantry general (1915). He served as Russia's Minister of War from June 1915 until the Tsarina Alexandra forced his removal from office in March 1916.

== Biography ==
Polivanov was born to an aristocratic family. He graduated from the Nikolaevsky Military Engineering Academy in Petersburg, present-day Saint Petersburg Military Engineering-Technical University (Nikolaevsky), from which he graduated in 1880. He served in the 1877–78 Russo-Turkish War. He later became a member of the Russian General Staff (1899–1904), rising in 1905 to become its chief the following year.

Following the disastrous defeat in the 1904–1905 Russo-Japanese War, he was appointed assistant Minister of War and quickly recommended extensive political and military reforms. However, he was dismissed in 1912 because of his cooperation with liberal factions within the Duma.

Polivanov was appointed to the State Council in 1912 and served until June 1915 when he replaced Vladimir Sukhomlinov as Minister of War; and at once started transforming the Russian army's training system and tried with limited success to improve its supply and communications systems.

However, in August 1915 he became aware of Tsar Nicholas II's plan to replace Grand Duke Nikolai as commander-in-chief of the army and personally lead the Russian armies at the front, and made strenuous efforts to persuade him not to.

This helped alienate Polivanov from the Tsarina, who then conspired to have him sacked, and achieved this when Tsar Nicholas dismissed him in March 1916. He was succeeded by Dmitry Shuvayev.

Following the Russian Revolution, Polivanov joined the Red Army in February 1920, participating in the Soviet-Polish peace talks in Riga later that year but died of typhus during the talks.

He was awarded Order of Prince Danilo I and other decorations.
