= Pyotr Konovnitsyn =

- Пётр Коновницын
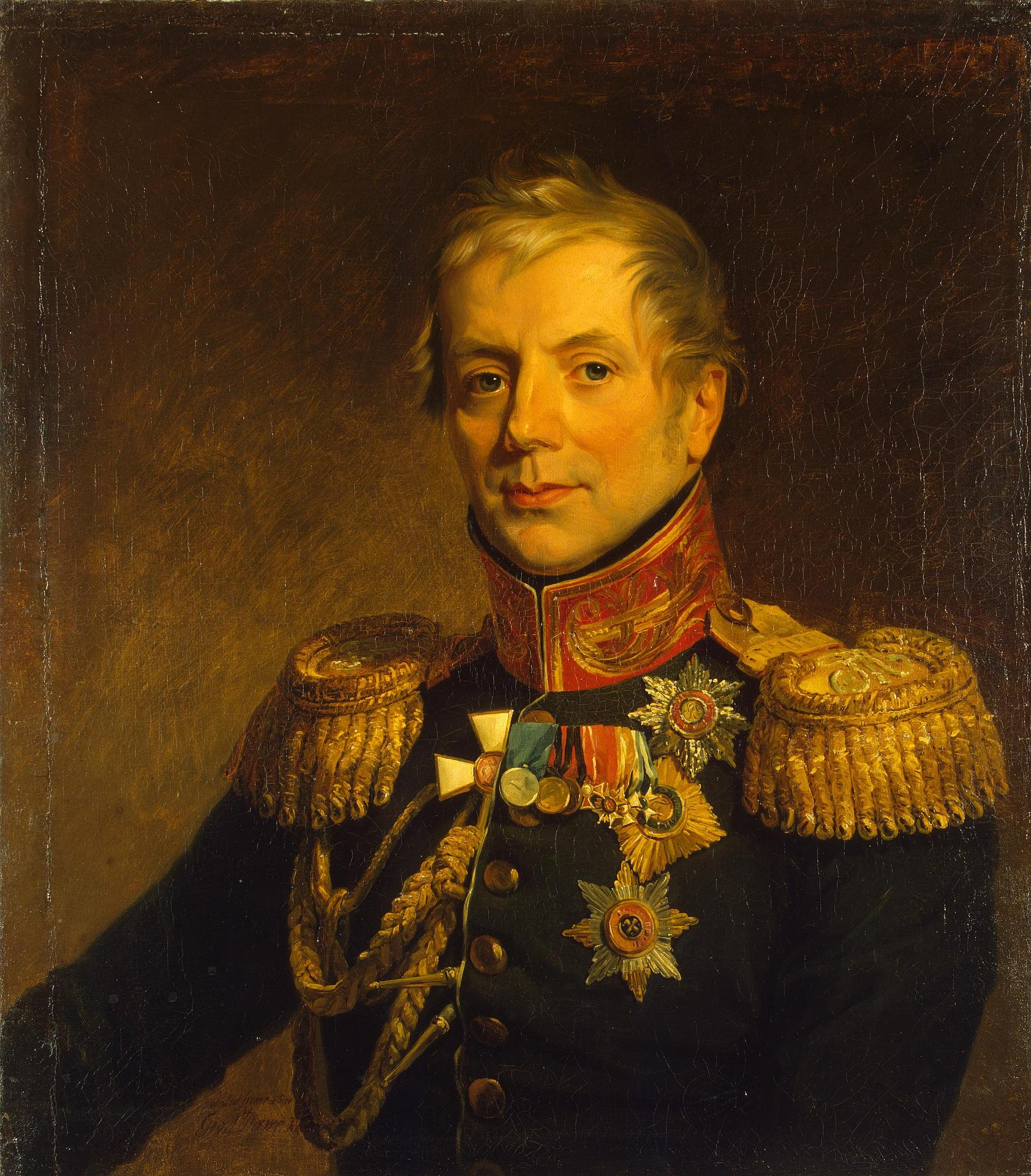

Minister of War of the Russian Empire
- In office 1815–1819
- Monarch: Nicholas I
- Preceded by: Aleksey Gorchakov
- Succeeded by: Pyotr Meller-Zakomelsky

Governor of Arkhangelsk Governorate
- In office 1793–1796
- Monarch: Nicholas I
- Preceded by: Timofey Tutolmin
- Succeeded by: Ivan Liven

Personal details
- Born: 9 October [O.S. 28 September] 1764 Pskov, Russian Empire
- Died: 9 September 1822 (aged 57) Petergof
- Resting place: Kyarovo estate
- Spouse: Anna Konovnitsyna
- Education: Second Cadet Corps
- Awards: Order of St. Alexander Nevsky; Order of St. Vladimir; Order of St. Anna; Order of St. George; Golden Weapon for Bravery; Order of the Red Eagle; Order of Leopold; Military Order of Max Joseph; Order of Saint Louis

Military service
- Allegiance: Russian Empire
- Branch/service: Imperial Russian Army
- Years of service: 1785-1822
- Rank: General of the Infantry
- Unit: Semyonovsky Life Guards Regiment; His Imperial Majesty's Retinue
- Commands: 29th Chernigov Infantry Regiment; Grenadier Corps
- Battles/wars: Russo-Swedish War (1788–1790); Russo-Turkish War (1787–1792); Polish–Russian War (1792); War of the Fourth Coalition; Finnish War; French Invasion of Russia; • Battle of Vitebsk (1812)

Count Pyotr Petrovich Konovnitsyn (Russian: Пётр Петро́вич Коновни́цын; 1764–1822) was a Russian military leader, General of Infantry, who served as Minister of War of the Russian Empire from 1815 to 1819.

== Biography ==
Born in Pskov to the family of a local landowner, Pyotr Petrovich Konovnitsyn, who later became the Governor of Saint Petersburg. From a noble family that traced its roots back to the roots of the House of Romanov (that is, to Andrei Kobyla). He spent his childhood and youth in the family estate of Kyarovo, Gdovsky Uyezd Saint Petersburg Governorate.

In 1770, he was enrolled in the Artillery and Engineering Gentry Cadet Corps. On October 8, 1774, he was enrolled as a furir to the Semyonovsky Life Guards Regiment. He received his education and upbringing at home. He began his active service on January 12, 1785, in the Semyonovsky Life Guards Regiment as a sub-ensign. He participated in the Russo-Swedish War of 1788-1790.

On July 3, 1791, he was sent with the rank of Prime major to the war with Turkey. On September 7, he was promoted to podpolkovnik and appointed adjutant to Grigory Potemkin to fill the vacancy of Captain 2nd rank Senyavin. He did not have time to take part in the hostilities, since a peace was soon concluded in Iași. In Iasi, he first met Mikhail Kutuzov.

On February 23, 1792, he was promoted to colonel and on June 1, he was appointed commander of the Stary Oskol Musketeer Regiment. He took part in the Polish campaigns of 1792 and of 1794.

On September 28, 1797, he was promoted to major general and appointed chief of the Kiev 5th Grenadier Regiment and on March 23, 1798, as chief of the Uglich Musketeer Regiment; on November 13, 1798, he was dismissed and spent eight years in seclusion on his estate in Kyarovo. He devoted much time to his self-education, including military science.

In 1806, with the beginning of the war between Russia and Prussia against Napoleon, he arrived in Saint Petersburg, where in December, with the approval of Emperor Alexander I, he was elected head of the zemstvo opolchenie of the Saint Petersburg Governorate. He participated in the formation and direction of new troops to the theater of military operations. He was awarded the Order of Saint Anna, 1st degree. Alexander I granted him 3,000 Dessiatins of land and wished to see him again in military service. On December 7, 1807, he re-entered active service and was appointed to the His Imperial Majesty's Retinue.

On February 1, 1808, he was appointed duty general to Friedrich Wilhelm von Buxhoeveden, who led the Imperial Russian Army in the Russo-Swedish War of 1808–1809. Konovnitsyn's main tasks included providing the army with all the necessary material resources, but he did not miss the opportunity to personally participate in the fighting. For his active participation in the capture of Svartholm fortress and Sveaborg (March 18), Konovnitsyn was awarded the rank of lieutenant general on April 24. On August 2, in a naval battle near the island of Kimitoön, he assumed command in a naval battle, leading a rowing flotilla that repelled an attack by 12 Swedish gunboats. On February March 1, 1809, he was awarded the Order of St. George.

From May 6, 1809, he was appointed chief of the 29th Chernigov Infantry Regiment and head of the 3rd Infantry Division. Due to Russia's participation in the continental blockade of England and the limitation of its naval operations, Konovnitsyn's division guarded the shores of the Baltic Sea.

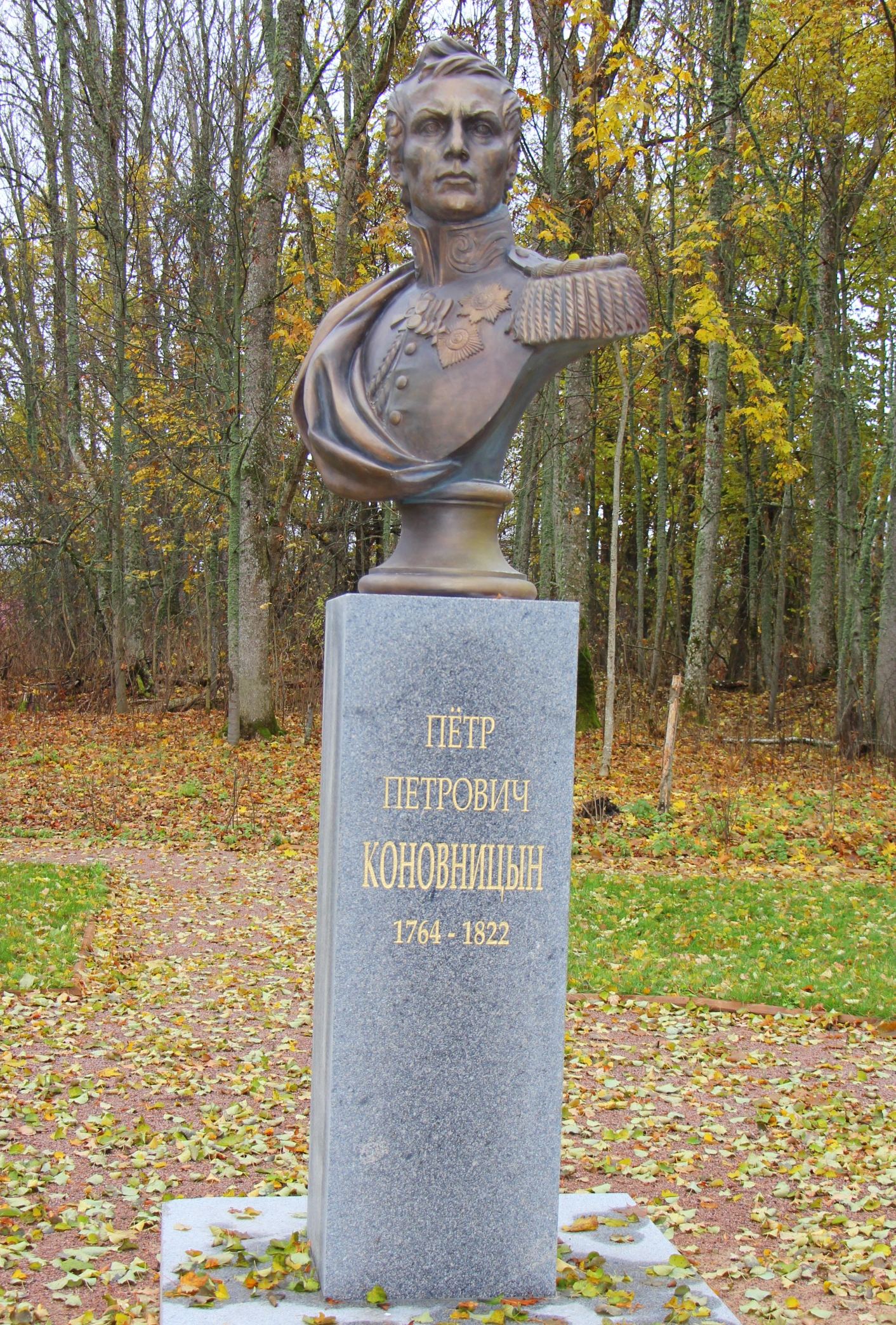
Konovnitsyn's statue in Gdov, Pskov Oblast

At the beginning of the French Invasion of Russia, Konovnitsyn's 3rd Infantry Division was in General Nikolay Tuchkov corps as part of Michael Andreas Barclay de Tolly's First Western Army. On July 14, at Ostrovno, the division entered into its first battle with the French. Having replaced General Alexander Ivanovich Ostermann-Tolstoy's corps, it held back the enemy's onslaught all day, ensuring the retreat of the army's main forces, first against Murat and Beauharnais, and then against Napoleon. On the same month his forces fought the Battle of Vitebsk.

On August 16, he defended the Malakhov Gate of Smolensk, remaining wounded in the ranks, and on August 17, he fought at Lubin. On August 19, he distinguished himself in the Battle of Valutino. From August 29, he commanded the rearguard of the combined armies; under his command were troops numbering up to 30 thousand soldier. He participated in daily skirmishes with Murat's cavalry corps. On August 31, he endured a 13-hour battle with three enemy corps near Gzhatsk, and on September 4, he repelled attacks by Louis-Nicolas Davout and Joachim Murat for 10 hours near the village of Gridnevo.

On September 9, Commander-in-Chief Kutuzov appointed Konovnitsyn commander of the 3rd Corps (in place of the mortally wounded Nikolay Tuchkov). At the Council at Fili, Konovnitsyn voted for a new battle near Moscow. He, like most other generals, objected the Kutuzov's decision to abandon Moscow.

On September 16, Kutuzov appointed Konovnitsyn as the duty general of the Russian Army headquarters. From that time on, Konovnitsyn became the first reporter to the commander-in-chief; all of Kutuzov's combat correspondence with the military leaders subordinate to him passed through him. Papers signed by Konovnitsyn were sent to Grand Duke Konstantin Pavlovich of Russia and Aleksey Arakcheyev.

In the camp near Tarutino, he was engaged in the reception and distribution of reinforcements, their training and preparation. He then participated in the Battle of Tarutino. Near Maloyaroslavets, Kutuzov was forced to send Konovnitsyn with the 3rd Infantry Division to drive the French out of the city. As the duty general, Konovnitsyn was with Kutuzov during the entire pursuit of Napoleon's army until the Russian troops occupied Vilnius.

As a token of gratitude to his favourite, Commander-in-Chief Kutuzov presented Konovnitsyn with the Order of St. George, 2nd class, which belonged to him (later, in 1814, in Paris, this token was "temporarily confiscated" from Konovnitsyn for urgent presentation to the new knight of the order, British Field Marshal Arthur Wellesley; it is currently kept in the Wellington Museum in London; in exchange, Konovnitsyn was sent a new token of the order from the Chapter of Orders).

In January 1813, Konovnitsyn was appointed commander of the Grenadier Corps, which was considered second in the hierarchy of the Russian army after Guards units. The first battle in which the corps took part was the Battle of Lützen. This battle was the last one for Konovnitsyn, when he led troops directly on the battlefield. Being wounded on April 20, he was visited by Alexander I who was present on the battlefield, at his apartment in Lebestedt. Returning to the army in September, he was assigned to be with Alexander I, carrying out his instructions. For his participation in the Battle of Leipzig, he received the Order of Saint Vladimir, 1st degree.

On December 24, 1815, Konovnitsyn was appointed Minister of War and was included in the State Council, the Committee of Ministers, and the Governing Senate. On December 24, 1817, he was promoted to full general, receiving the rank of General of Infantry.

On May 18, 1819, Konovnitsyn had asked Alexander I for leave to Mineralnye Vody for treatment. The enormous strain of his strength during the war, his wounds, especially the one received at the Battle of Lützen, had taken their toll. The Emperor informed in a personal letter that he was granting the request.

On November December 7, 1819, he was appointed by the Emperor the Chief Director of the Corps of Pages, First and Second Cadet, Noble Regiment, Imperial Military Orphanage, Smolensk Cadet Corps and Noble Squadron under the command of His Imperial Highness the Tsarevich, a member of the Council on Military Schools and a committee under the jurisdiction of this council.

On September 9, 1822, Konovnitsyn died at his dacha near Petergof. The funeral service in the Cadet Corps Church was attended by the highest government officials. Grand Duke Nikolai Pavlovich, his former ward, took part in the removal of the coffin, which was then sent to the Konovnitsyn family estate, the Kyarovo estate, where Konovnitsyn was buried.

Konovnitsyn was in service for more than a quarter of a century. His diary, covering the events of 1813–1815, was published in fragments. He provided great assistance to his former adjutant Dmitry Akhsharumov in writing and publishing the first history of the Patriotic War of 1812 - "The Description of the War of 1812".

He was depicted in the book War and Peace by Lev Tolstoy and in the film Kutuzov, played by Konstantin Shilovtsev.
