= Aleksandr Tatischev =

Russian military leader of the Napoleonic Wars

- Александр Татищев
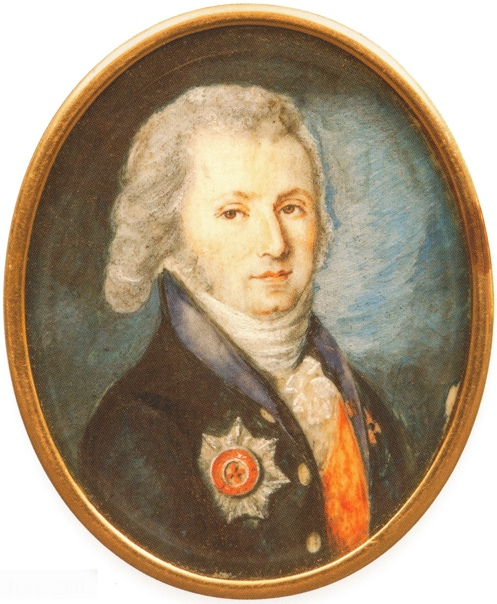

Minister of War of the Russian Empire
- In office 14 March 1823 – 26 August 1827
- Monarchs: Alexander I Nicholas I
- Preceded by: Pyotr Meller-Zakomelsky
- Succeeded by: Alexander Chernyshyov

Personal details
- Born: 19 August [O.S. 8 August] 1763 Rylsky Uyezd, Russian Empire
- Died: 17 June 1833 (aged 69)
- Awards: Order of St. Vladimir; Order of St. Anna; Order of St. Alexander Nevsky

Military service
- Allegiance: Russian Empire
- Branch/service: Imperial Russian Army
- Years of service: 1774—1827
- Rank: General of the Infantry
- Battles/wars: Siege of Ochakov; Russo-Turkish War; Polish–Russian War; French Invasion of Russia

Count Alexandr Ivanovich Tatischev (Russian: Александр Иванович Татищев; August 8 (19), 1763 – June 17 (29), 1833) was a Russian military leader of the Napoleonic Wars, infantry general (1823) and Minister of War from 1823 to 1827.

== Biography ==
Alexandr Ivanovich Tatischev comes from the ancient noble family of Tatischev. He was born on August 8, 1763, in the family of the Rylsky Uyezd Marshal of Nobility, captain Ivan Alekseevich Tatishchev (1738–1786). He was the nephew of Nikolai Tatishchev.

He was educated at home. In January 1774 he joined the Novotroitsk Cuirassier Regiment as a Wachtmeister. In September 1776 he was promoted to cornet rank, in September 1779 to lieutenant, in March 1784 to captain and in June 1787 to second major. Together with the regiment he took part in the Russo-Turkish War of 1787-1792, and participated in the Siege of Ochakov in 1788. In September 1790 he was promoted to premier major. He took part in the war with Poland in 1792. He was granted the rank of lieutenant colonel for distinction in the Battle of Grinov in June 1792. In October 1793, he transferred to the Poltava Light Cavalry Regiment, from where in January 1794, by the Imperial decree, he was sent to the Active State Councillor with the rank of "present". In February 1795, he was appointed manager of the carriages of the Grand Dukes Aleksandr and Konstantin Pavlovich, with the rank of non-commissioned equerry.

After the accession of Emperor Paul I, on November 9, 1796, he was awarded the rank of colonel. On October 18, 1797, he was renamed to the rank of State Councillor, while retaining the position of adviser to the Court Stable Office. On July 9, 1798, he was dismissed from service, at his request "due to illness", with promotion to the rank of actual state councilor.

On July 9, 1801, he was accepted into service, assigned to the provisions staff and renamed major general. On August 13, 1803, he was dismissed from service. He settled in Moscow. In November 1806, when the militia was being formed, the Moscow nobility elected Tatischev first as the Moscow district chief, and then as the brigade chief of the mobile militia. In this rank, he attracted the attention of Emperor Alexander I, who in 1807 granted him the Order of St. Anne, 1st degree, and somewhat later the diamond badges of this order, and on March 24, 1808, appointed him general-kriegcommissar. In 1810, he was awarded the Order of Saint Vladimir, 2nd degree. On August 30, 1811, he was promoted to lieutenant general. Since after the creation of His Majesty's General Staff the Minister of War was left in charge of the economic part of the military department, Tatishchev, who had been the chief quartermaster for 15 years, was considered a suitable candidate to fill the post of Minister of War. On March 14, 1823, he was appointed acting Minister of War. On December 12, he was promoted to General of Infantry and confirmed in the post of Minister of War. He was appointed a senator and a member of the State Council. In 1824, he was awarded the Order of Saint Alexander Nevsky.

In January 1826, he was appointed Chairman of the Investigative Commission on the Decembrist revolt. Decembrist Andrei Rosen recalled Tatischev as follows:

The Chairman of the Commission, Tatischev, rarely interfered in the investigation of the case; he only occasionally remarked to overzealous defendants: "You, gentlemen, have read everything - Destutt-Tracy, and Benjamin Constant, and Bentham - and this is where you ended up, but I have read only the Holy Scriptures all my life, and look what I have earned," - pointing to the two rows of stars that illuminated his chest.

On the day of the coronation of Emperor Nicholas I, August 22, 1826, he was elevated, with descendants, to the rank of count of the Russian Empire. He was awarded the Order of Saint Vladimir, 1st degree. On August 26, 1827, he was dismissed from service, at his request due to illness. He died without descendants on June 17, 1833.
