= Peter von der Pahlen =

Peter von der Pahlen may refer to:

- Peter Graf von der Pahlen (1777–1864), Russian military commander
- Peter Ludwig von der Pahlen (1745–1826), Baltic German general
