= General Gorchakov =

General Gorchakov may refer to:

- Aleksey Gorchakov (1769–1817), Imperial Russian Army general
- Andrei Ivanovich Gorchakov (1768–1855), Imperial Russian Army lieutenant general
- Mikhail Dmitrievich Gorchakov (1793–1861), Imperial Russian Army general of the artillery
- Pyotr Gorchakov (1790–1868), Imperial Russian Army general
