= Saltanawka =

Saltanawka (Belarusian: Салтанаўка) or Saltanovka (Russian: Салтановка) may refer to the following places in Belarus:

- Saltanawka, Buda-Kashalyova District, a village in Buda-Kashalyova District, Gomel Region
- Saltanawka, Zhlobin District, a village in Zhlobin District, Gomel Region
- Saltanawka, Mogilev Region, a village in Mogilev District, Mogilev Region
