= Jan Chrucki =

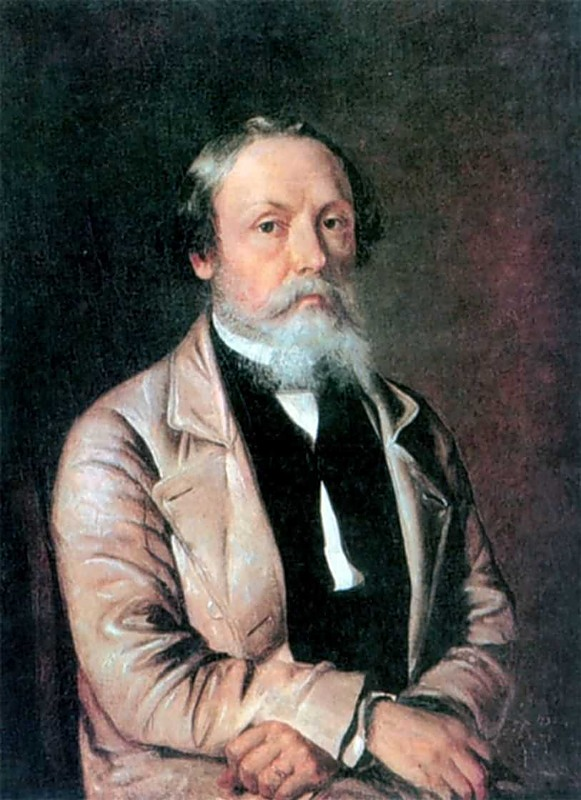
- Ivan Khrutsky, self-portrait, 1883
- Born: 8 February 1810; Ulla, Vitebsk Governorate, Russian Empire
- Died: 26 January 1885 (aged 74); Zakharnichi, Russian Empire
- Known for: Painter
- Movement: Realism

Jan Chrucki (Ivan Fomich Khrutsky, Russian: Иван Фомич Хруцкий; Belarusian: Іван Хруцкі; 1810–1885) was a Polish-Russian painter of Belarusian descent known by his still lifes and portraits.

== Biography ==
He was born into a Greek-Catholic Polish-Belarusian family descended from the nobility of Leliwa coat of arms in the village of Ulla, Vitebsk Governorate. His father Tomasz, like his relatives, was a Greek Catholic priest, his mother's name was Minadora (or Menodowa) Kuryłło. He was educated at the Piarist Lyceum in Polotsk, which had university rights, then in 1827 he went to St. Petersburg. He studied privately with George Dawe, then around 1830 entered the Imperial Academy of Arts. There he established contacts with another Polish painter Jozef Oleszkiewicz, who introduced him to the Hermitage.

His first known works are dated 1832. The paintings gradually gathered public and critical acclaim. Khrutsky also worked as an interior designer, and became a popular amongst the wealthy home owners. In 1836 he was awarded the Major Silver medal of the academy for his still-lifes. Khrutsky also executed nice genre pictures and portraits. Old Woman Knitting a Sock, brought him the Minor Gold medal of the academy. In 1839 he was awarded the title of the Academician.

After his father's death in 1840 Khrutsky left St. Petersburg forever and settled in the family estate Zacharnicze (Zakharenichi, Zacharniczy), Polotsk region. This period was one of commissioned religious art, mostly from Lithuania. He spent a lot of time in Vilnius, where he made several works from nature on the orders of Jan Kazimierz Wilczyński for the "Album Wileńskie". Besides religious paintings he also worked on portraits, such as I.I. Glazunov's, Józef Siemaszko's, Mikołaj Malinowski's and others.

He died in his estate in Zacharnicze in 1885.

== Family ==
In 1845 he married Anna Odrowąż-Bębnowska (b. 1822), daughter of Ksawery, captain in the Kościuszko Uprising of 1794. With her he had a daughter, Maria, and a son, Józef (d. 1918), who inherited the family estate.

Two of Chrucki's brothers were also painters. The younger Andrzej - from 1845 a free student of St. Petersburg Academy of Fine Arts, who in 1854 was awarded the title "unclassified painter", from 1870, lived with his brother's family in Zacharnicze. Older brother Eustachy, a portrait painter, who graduated from the Academy of Fine Arts in 1842, also with the title of "unclassified painter", settled down in St. Petersburg.

== Selected paintings ==
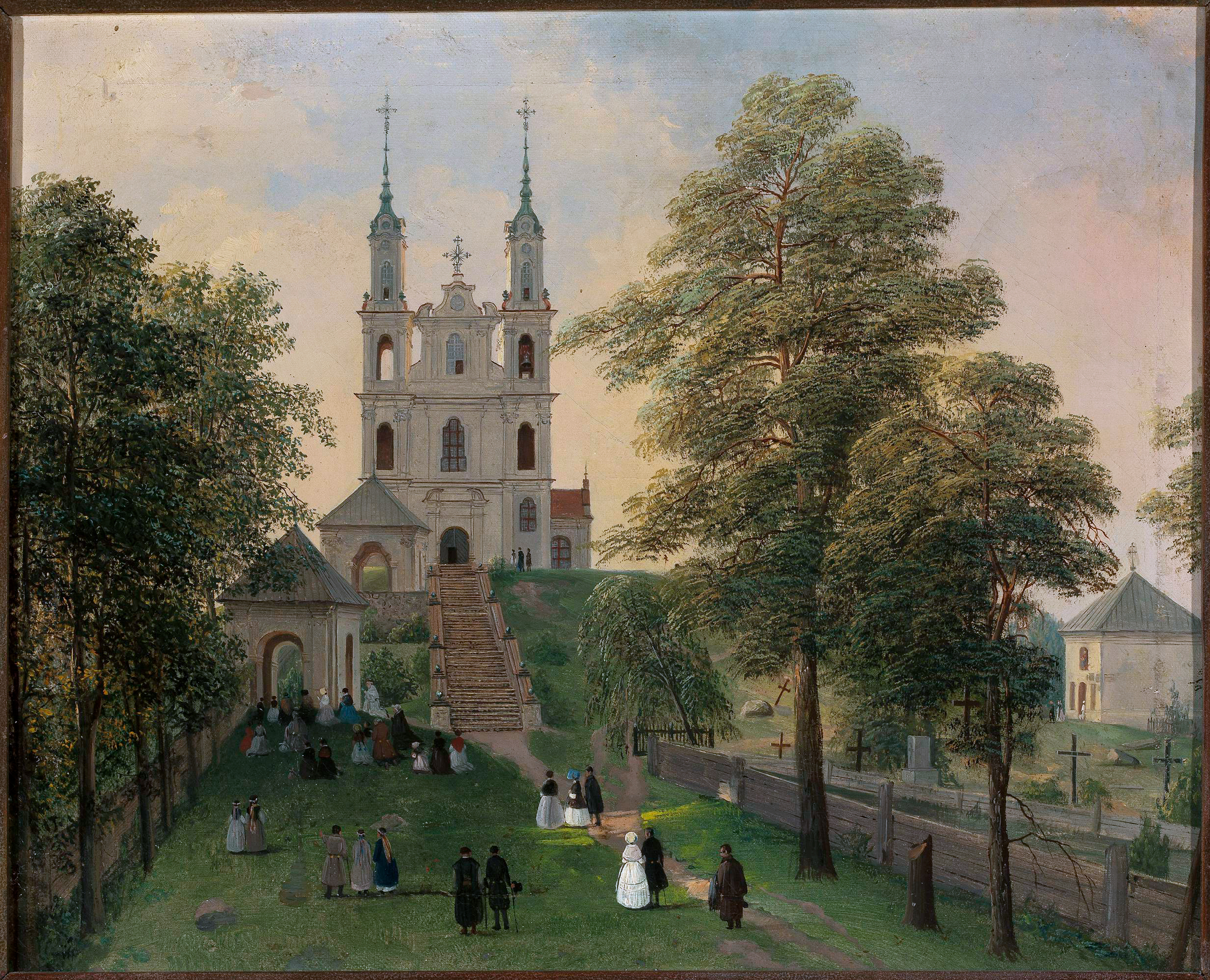
Verkiai Calvary

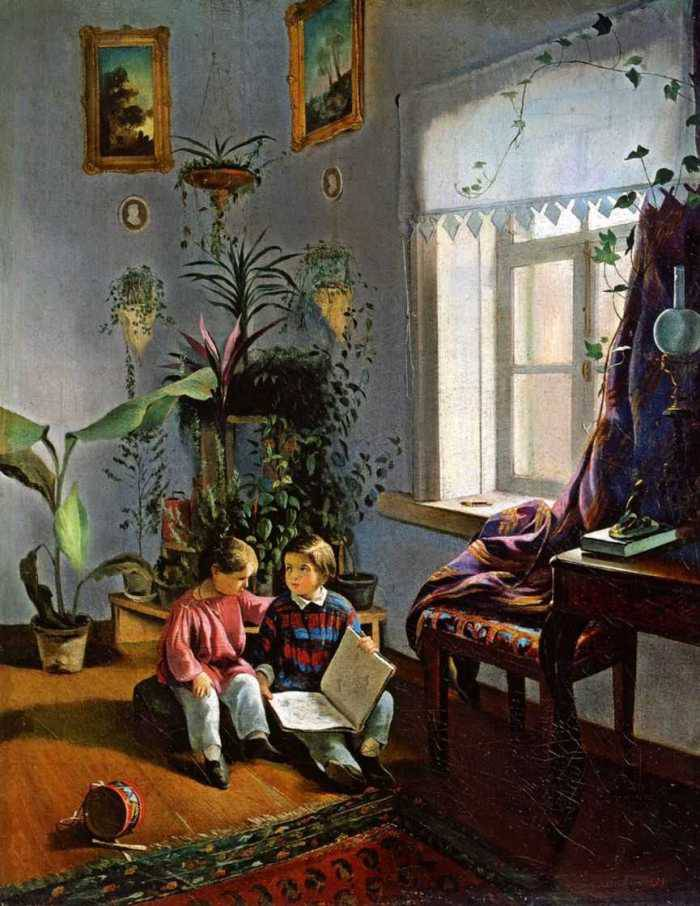
In the Room

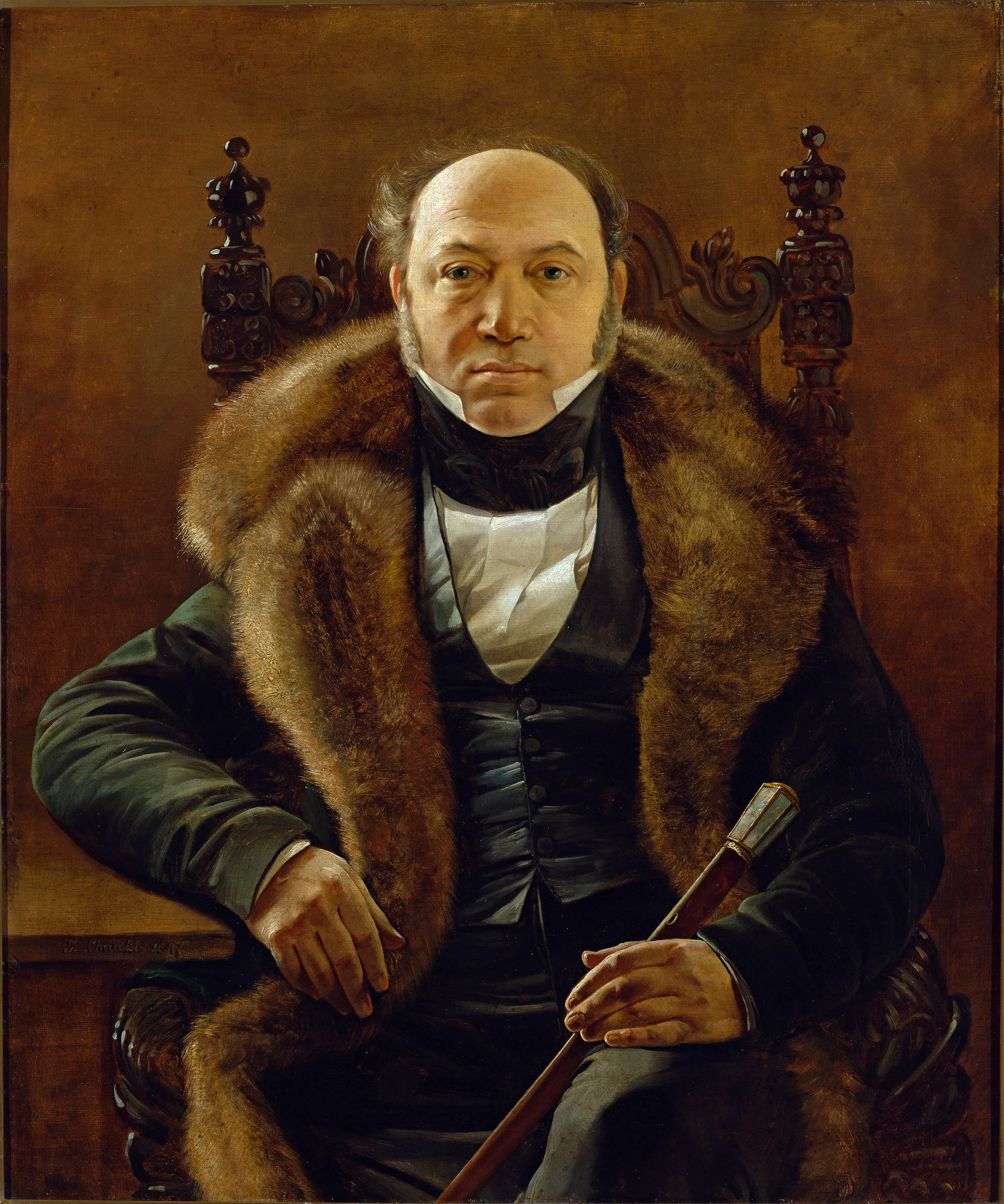
Portrait of historian and journalist Mikołaj Malinowski (1799-1865)

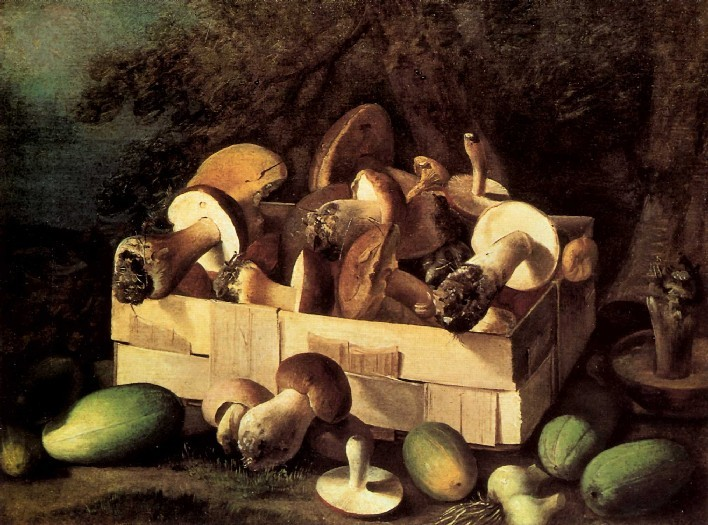
Still life with Mushrooms

== Sources ==
- Miłobędzka, Joanna (1962). "Jan Chrucki - nowe dane do życia i twórczości" [Jan Chrucki - new data on life and work]. Biuletyn historii sztuki. 24 (1): 171–184.
- Kuznetsov, Sergey (1998). "Malarz Jan Chrucki. Portret XIX-wiecznego "artysty średniego"" [Painter Jan Chrucki. Portrait of a 19th century "middle artist"]. Biuletyn historii sztuki. 60 (1–2): 49–67.
