= Beshankovichy district =

District of Vitebsk region, Belarus

Beshankovichy district Бешанковіцкі раён (Belarusian)
- District
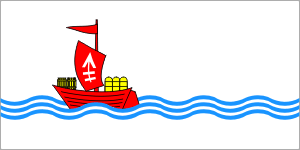
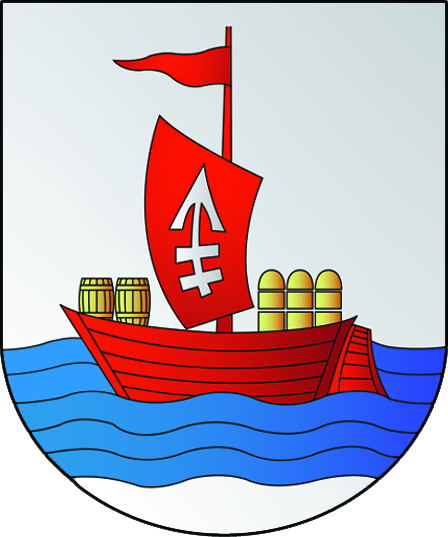
- Flag Coat of arms

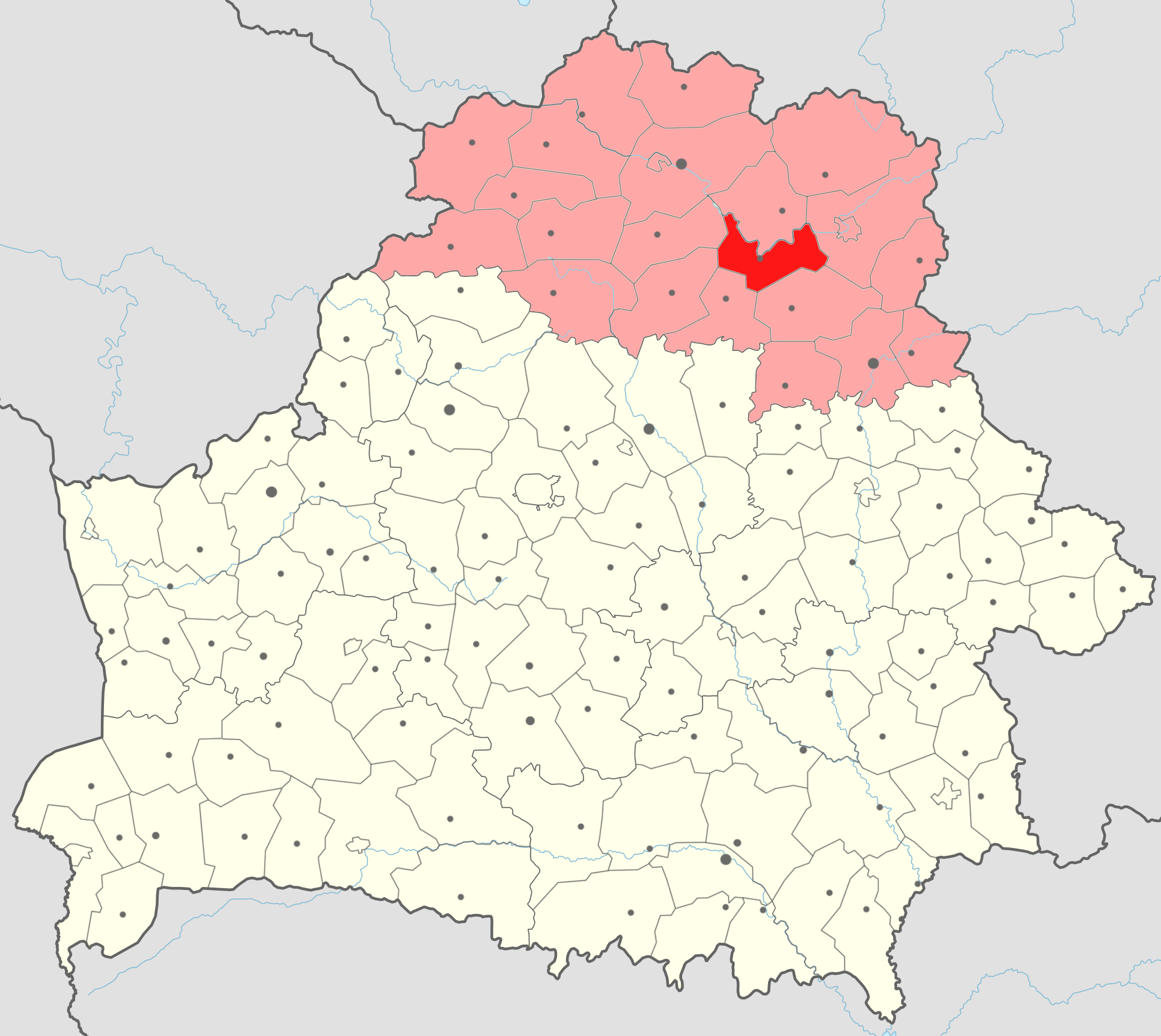
- Coordinates: 55°02′N 29°27′E
- Country: Belarus
- Region: Vitebsk region
- Administrative center: Beshankovichy

Area
  - Total: 1,249.65 km^{2} (482.49 sq mi)
- Elevation: 137 m (449 ft)

Population (2023)
  - Total: 13,653
  - Density: 10.925/km^{2} (28.297/sq mi)
- Time zone: UTC+3 (MSK)

Beshankovichy district or Biešankovičy district (Belarusian: Бешанко́віцкі раён, romanized: Biešankovicki rajon; Russian: Бешенковичский район) is a district (raion) of Vitebsk region in Belarus. The Vula River flows through the district. Its administrative center is Beshankovichy.

== Notable residents ==
- Jan Chrucki (1810, Vuła village–1885), Belarusian artist
- Hryhory Sandler (1912, Ostrovno village–1994), Soviet choral conductor
- Leŭ Sapieha (1557, Astroŭna estate (now village) – 1633), a nobleman and statesman of the Polish–Lithuanian Commonwealth and governor of Słonim, Bieraście and Mahiloŭ
