= Pyotr Meller-Zakomelsky =

- Пётр Меллер-Закомельский
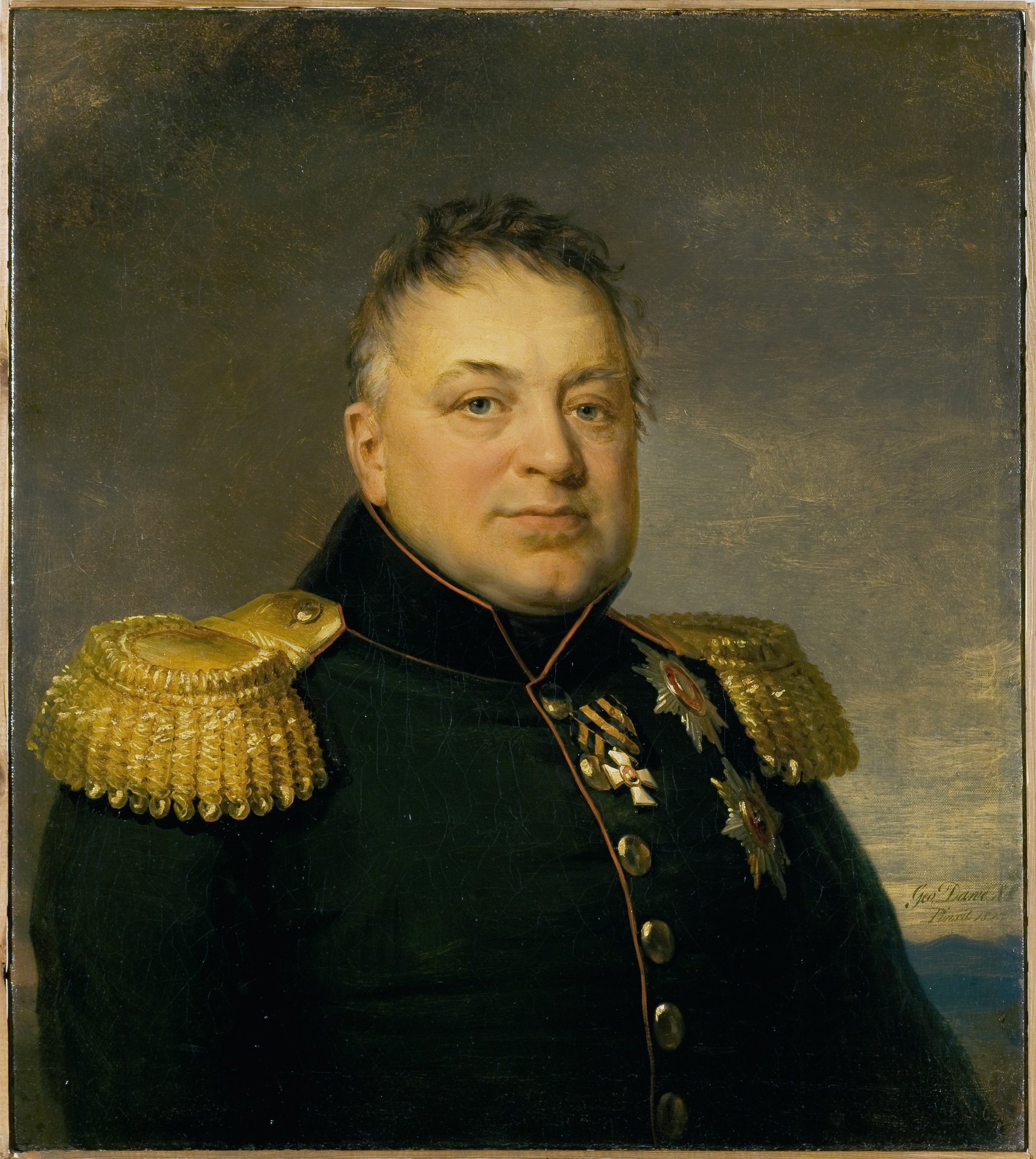

Minister of War of the Russian Empire
- In office 1819–1823
- Monarch: Nicholas I
- Preceded by: Pyotr Konovnitsyn
- Succeeded by: Aleksandr Tatischev

Personal details
- Born: 8 November [O.S. 28 October] 1755 Saint Peterburg, Russian Empire
- Died: 9 June 1823 (aged 67) Mineralnye Vody
- Resting place: Volkovo Cemetery
- Parent: Ivan Ivanovich Möller-Sakomelsky (father)
- Education: Second Cadet Corps
- Awards: Order of St. Alexander Nevsky; Order of St. Vladimir; Order of St. Anna; Order of St. George

Military service
- Allegiance: Russian Empire
- Branch/service: Imperial Russian Army
- Years of service: 1739-1790
- Rank: General of the Infantry
- Battles/wars: Siege of Ochakov; Russo-Turkish War; Polish–Russian War; Battle of Austerlitz

Baron Pyotr Ivanovich Meller-Zakomelsky (Russian: Пётр Иванович Меллер-Закомельский; October 28 (November 8), 1755 – June 9 (21), 1823) was a Russian military leader and General of Artillery (1814) who served as Minister of War of the Russian Empire from 1819 to 1823.

== Biography ==
He was born in Saint Peterburg into the family of General-in-Chief Ivan Ivanovich Möller-Sakomelsky, who received the title of Baron and the surname Meller-Zakomelsky on December 6, 1788, in connection with his distinction in the capture of the Turkish fortress of Ochakov. He was educated in the Artillery and Engineering Gentry Corps. On November 30, 1769, he began serving as an ensign and was appointed adjutant to his father. On January 1, 1772, he was assigned to the Engineering Corps. On June 5, 1773, he was appointed adjutant of the Bombardier Regiment. He participated in the Russo-Turkish War of 1787–1792 and the suppression of the Kościuszko Uprising. In 1805 during the Battle of Austerlitz, he commanded the artillery of the 1st Army. In 1807 he was appointed commander of the 10th Infantry Division. On December 12, 1807, he was appointed member of the Military Collegium and manager of the Artillery Expedition. On January 19, 1808, he was appointed chief inspector of artillery. From 1808 to 1810 he was simultaneously head of the Provisions Department. One of the closest associates of Aleksey Arakcheyev. On February 28, 1812, he was appointed Director of the Artillery Department of the Ministry of War. Did a lot to develop and improve Russian artillery on the eve of the French invasion of Russia. With the outbreak of war, took command of the Saint Peterburg and Novgorod militias from Mikhail Kutuzov, was with the 1st Army and took part in hostilities. In 1813-1814 he was engaged in the formation of artillery reserves with the Reserve Army. On 27 April 1815 he was appointed Commander of the Reserve Army. From May 6, 1819, to March 14, 1823, he served as Minister of War. On December 2, 1819, he became member of the State Council. In March 1823, he was sent on indefinite leave for treatment in Mineralnye Vody. He died there and was buried at the Volkovo Cemetery. His grave is lost.
