= Sergey Kuznetsov (historian) =

Russian historian and art historian

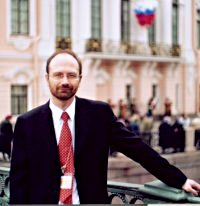
Kuznetsov on 23 May 2003

Sergey Olegovich Kuznetsov (Russian: Серге́й Оле́гович Кузнецо́в; born 7 December 1960, Leningrad) is a Russian historian and art historian, specialising in the history of the Stroganov family.

== Life ==
Between 1981 and 1987 Kuznetsov studied Russian and world art at the Faculty of History at the Leningrad State University. Ivan Chechot (Иван Дмитриевич Чечот) was one of his teachers. In 1984, in parallel with his studies, he began working at the department of painting (18th–19th centuries) at the State Russian Museum and participated in preparations for the anniversary exhibition of works by Dmitry Levitzky. Art painting of Levitsky became Kuznetsov's first significant research subject and resulted in his thesis, "Official prohibitions in the work of D. G. Levitzky. Their art principles and an ideological orientation" («Официальные заказы в творчестве Д. Г. Левицкого. Их художественные принципы и идеологическая направленность», 1987) and the book Неизвестный Левицкий. Портретное творчество живописца в контексте петербургского мифа (1996).

His further research work has included paintings of Jan Chrucki, Alexander Brullov, William Heste and Adam Menelaws. Kuznetsov is the author of more than 70 articles in the Grove Dictionary of Art (1996). Between 1990 and 2000 he reviewed Saint Petersburg art exhibitions for the magazines «Итоги» and «Арт-хроника» and newspapers «Российская культура» and «Время новостей».

The history of the Stroganov family became the second important topic of his research. In 1991, he examined the history of the Stroganov Palace. In 2006, he edited "Not worse than Thomon" («Не хуже Томона»), where he described the period of 1771–1817 in the history of the Stroganovs. The book was assessed by Vremya Novostei as one of the best Russian books in the field of art in 2007. In 2008, he defended his doctor of historical sciences dissertation on the subject «Государственная и меценатская деятельность рода Строгaновых в имперский период» (State and patronal activity of Stroganovs during the imperial period). At the same time he wrote the book Дома и дворцы Строгaновых (Houses and Palaces of Stroganovs), in which he described the history of the Stroganovs in the Tsarist period. New edition of this book with title '500 years of Strogonov' published in 2012 with special part about Marino estate of Sophia Stroganov near St. Petersburg. At same year such monument as Strogonoff garden got his book 'Stogonov dacha. About almost disappeared monument'. In 2003, he was awarded the Medal "In Commemoration of the 300th Anniversary of Saint Petersburg" («В память 300-летия Санкт-Петербурга»).

== Works ==
- Неизвестный Левицкий. Портретное творчество живописца в контексте петербургского мифа. — СПб., 1996.
- Дворцы Строгановых. — СПб.: ООО «Алмаз», 1998. — 160 с.
- Пусть Франция поучит нас «танцовать». Создание Строгоновского дворца в Петербурге и своеобразие придворной культуры России в первой половине XVIII века. — СПб., 2003. — 512 c. — ISBN 5-303-00109-1
- Не хуже Томона. Государственная, меценатская, собирательская деятельность рода Строгоновых в 1771—1817 гг. и формирование имперского облика Санкт-Петербурга. — СПБ.: Нестор, 2006—447 с — ISBN 5-303-00293-4
- Дворцы и дома Строгоновых. Три века истории. — М-СПб: Центрполиграф, МиМ-Дельта, 2008. — 319 с — ISBN 978-5-9524-3471-4
- Строгоновы. 500 лет рода. Выше только цари. - М-СПб: Центрполиграф, 2012. - 558 с - ISBN 978-5-227-03730-5
- Строгоновский сад. О почти исчезнувшем памятнике. - СПб: Коло, 2012. - 304 с - ISBN 978-5-901841-94-5
- Строгоновский дворец: архитектурная история. - СПб: Коло, 2015.
