= Grigori Sandler =

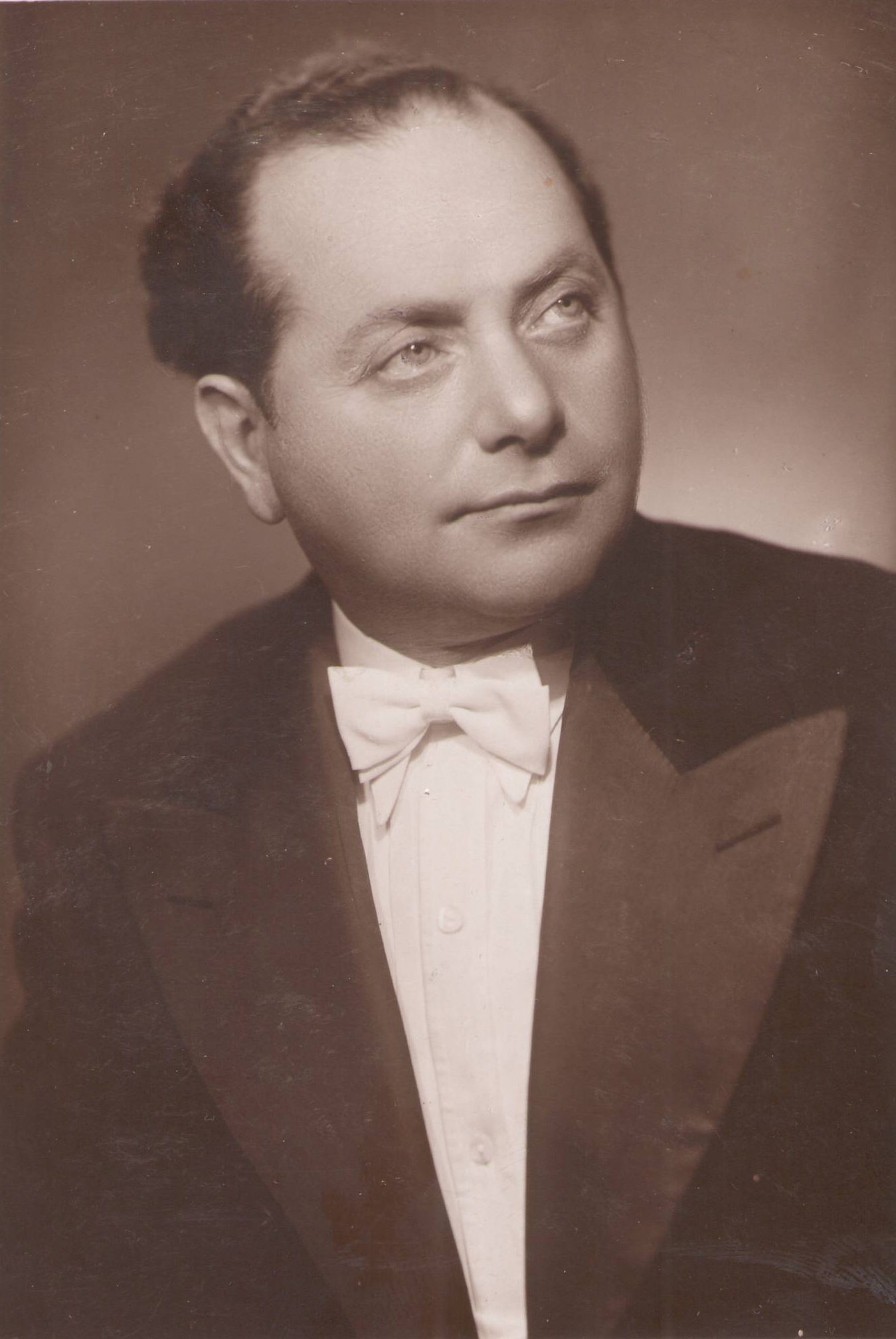
Grigori Sandler

Grigoriy Moiseevich Sandler (Russian: Сандлер, Григорий Моисеевич; village of Ostrovno, Sennensky Uyezd, Mogilev Governorate, 21 August 1912 - St. Petersburg, 1994) was a Soviet choral conductor. He was conductor of the Leningrad State University Students' Choir, founded 1949, for 45 years.

== Selected discography ==
- Shostakovich Ten Poems on Texts by Revolutionary Poets, Op. 88, 1951. Sviridov 7 Choruses. Leningrad Radio and TV Chorus, Grigori Sandler
