= Battle of Ostrovno =

1812 battle during the French invasion of Russia

- Part of the French invasion of Russia
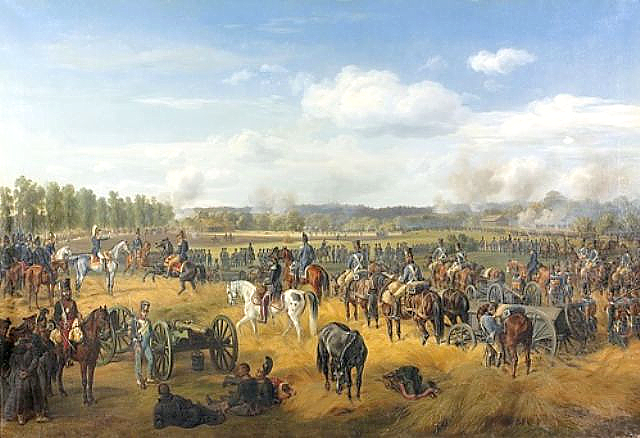
- Battle of Ostrovno by Albrecht Adam
Date	25 July 1812
Location	Ostrovno, Mogilev Governorate, Russian Empire (now Astrowna, Belarus) 55.1390°N 29.8554°E
Result	French victory

Belligerents
Russian Empire	Kingdom of Naples (First French Empire) French Empire

Commanders and leaders
(Russian Empire) A. Ostermann-Tolstoy	Joachim Murat (First French Empire) Étienne de Nansouty

Strength
2 infantry divisions 1 cavalry detachment 66 guns 14,000	1 infantry division 2 battalions 32 squadrons 23,000

Casualties and losses
2,500	3,000

French invasion of Russia
current battle
Prussian corps
Napoleon
Austrian corps

The Battle of Ostrovno (French: Combat d'Ostrowno) was a military engagement that took place on 25 July 1812, between French forces under the command of King of Naples Joachim Murat and Russian forces under General Ostermann-Tolstoy and ended with the Russian forces retreating from the battlefield.

== Context ==
With the beginning of the Russian campaign in late June 1812, Emperor Napoleon I launched a series of envelopment maneuvers with his Grande Armée. With the Russian Imperial armies before him, Napoleon's first such maneuver at Vilna, failed without any engagement taking place. Napoleon then launched a second such attempt aimed toward Vitebsk in a bid to turn the main Russian army under Barclay de Tolly. With French forces moving through different routes in the direction of Vitebsk, a first major engagement took place on 25 July near Ostrowno, 30 kilometers west of Vitebsk, when General Etienne de Nansouty's 1st Cavalry Reserve Corps encountered the forces of Russian General Alexander Ivanovich Ostermann-Tolstoy.

== Battle ==
Early on the morning of 25 July, General Nansouty set two of his divisions in motion, from the village of Boudilova and towards Ostrovno, in accordance with the orders he had received from the Emperor. Meanwhile, Murat, commanding the French forces in this sector, departed from the village of Beshankovichy with two battalions of the 8th Light infantry regiment, and headed towards Nansouty's position. Following Murat was the entire IV Army Corps of Viceroy Eugène de Beauharnais, spearheaded by the division of General Delzons, which was followed at some distance by that of General Broussier.

With Murat not yet on the field of battle, Nansouty's men encountered the vanguard of the Russian IV Corps, namely the 11th division under General Choglokov, the 23rd division of General Bakhmetiev, some cavalry and an artillery support of 66 pieces. Nansouty had under his command the light cavalry division of Bruyères (brigades Jacquinot, Piré and Nienwiewski) and the heavy cavalry division of Saint-Germain. In a bid to pin down the enemy and despite the disproportion in forces, Nansouty sent forward Piré's brigade (16th Chasseurs à cheval and 9th Chevau-légers lanciers) in a successful charge that dislodged the Russian vanguard and took 150 prisoners of war and 8 artillery pieces.

Murat then arrived on the battlefield with reinforcements, deploying his two battalions of light infantry, and assuming personal command of Saint-Germain's cuirassier division. With the cuirassiers successfully countercharging and repulsing a Russian Dragoon regiment that had come up to attack the right wing of the French forces, Murat realised that he was in a dangerous position and sent word to General Delzons to hasten his march towards the field of battle. Several attacks ensued, with the French committing Jacquinot's cavalry brigade and the infantry, but with the Russians holding ground. Realising his numeric superiority, the Russian commander, General Ostermann-Tolstoy, launched an attack against both French wings, in an attempt to catch them in double envelopment. However, with the arrival of a fresh French division, Delzon's 13th division, the Russian commander decided to call off his attack and pull back. Murat opted against a pursuit, given his inferior forces and knowing that Broussier's division was too far off behind Delzons to be counted on.

== Result ==
The Russians opted to withdraw from the field of battle. Despite Murat's bombastic report, claiming that the enemy lost 4,000-5,000 men dead or wounded and 700 to 800 prisoners, the Russian IV Corps probably lost 2,500 men, dead and wounded. French total losses are estimated at 3,000; the 2nd cuirassiers regiment registered high losses (187 horses lost), after enduring six hours of artillery fire. Additionally, during this engagement, which Napoleon labeled as "a vanguard action", French General Roussel was killed by a French sentry, who took him for a Russian soldier.

== Cultural references ==
Leo Tolstoy uses the battle in his War and Peace.

== See also ==
- List of battles of the French invasion of Russia

== Notes ==
Preceded by Battle of Saltanovka	Napoleonic Wars; Battle of Ostrovno	Succeeded by Battle of Vitebsk (1812)
