= Aleksey Gorchakov =

Russian general and statesman (1769–1817)

Prince Aleksey Ivanovich Gorchakov
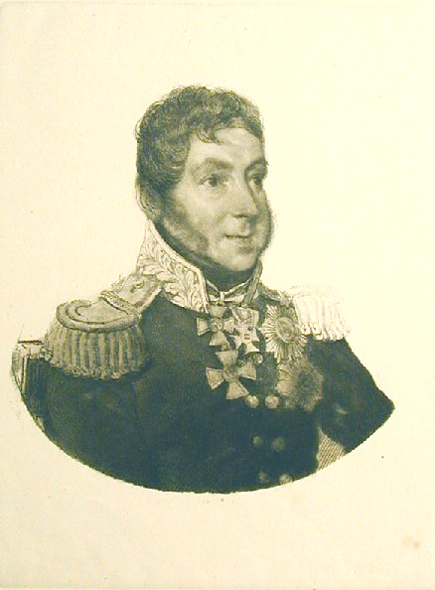
- Portrait by Orest Kiprensky, 1810s

Minister of War of the Russian Empire
- In office 1812–1815
- Monarch: Nicholas I
- Preceded by: Michael Andreas Barclay de Tolly
- Succeeded by: Pyotr Konovnitsyn

Personal details
- Born: May 20, 1769 Moscow
- Died: December 12, 1817 (aged 48) St. Petersburg
- Resting place: Lazarevskoe Cemetery
- Relations: Prince Ivan Gorchakov; Prince Alexander Suvorov
- Awards: Order of St. George (4th class); Order of St. Vladimir (4th class)

Military service
- Allegiance: Russian Empire
- Branch/service: Imperial Russian Army
- Years of service: 1786-1817
- Rank: General of the Infantry
- Unit: Preobrazhensky Life Guards Regiment
- Commands: Vryborg Garrison regiment
- Battles/wars: Russo-Turkish War (1787–1792); Polish–Russian War of 1792; Italian and Swiss expedition War of the Fourth Coalition

Prince Aleksey Ivanovich Gorchakov (Russian: Алексе́й Ива́нович Горчако́в; 20 May [O.S. 9 May] 1769 – 12 December [O.S. 30 November] 1817) was a general of the Russian Empire and statesman from the Gorchakov family.

== Biography ==
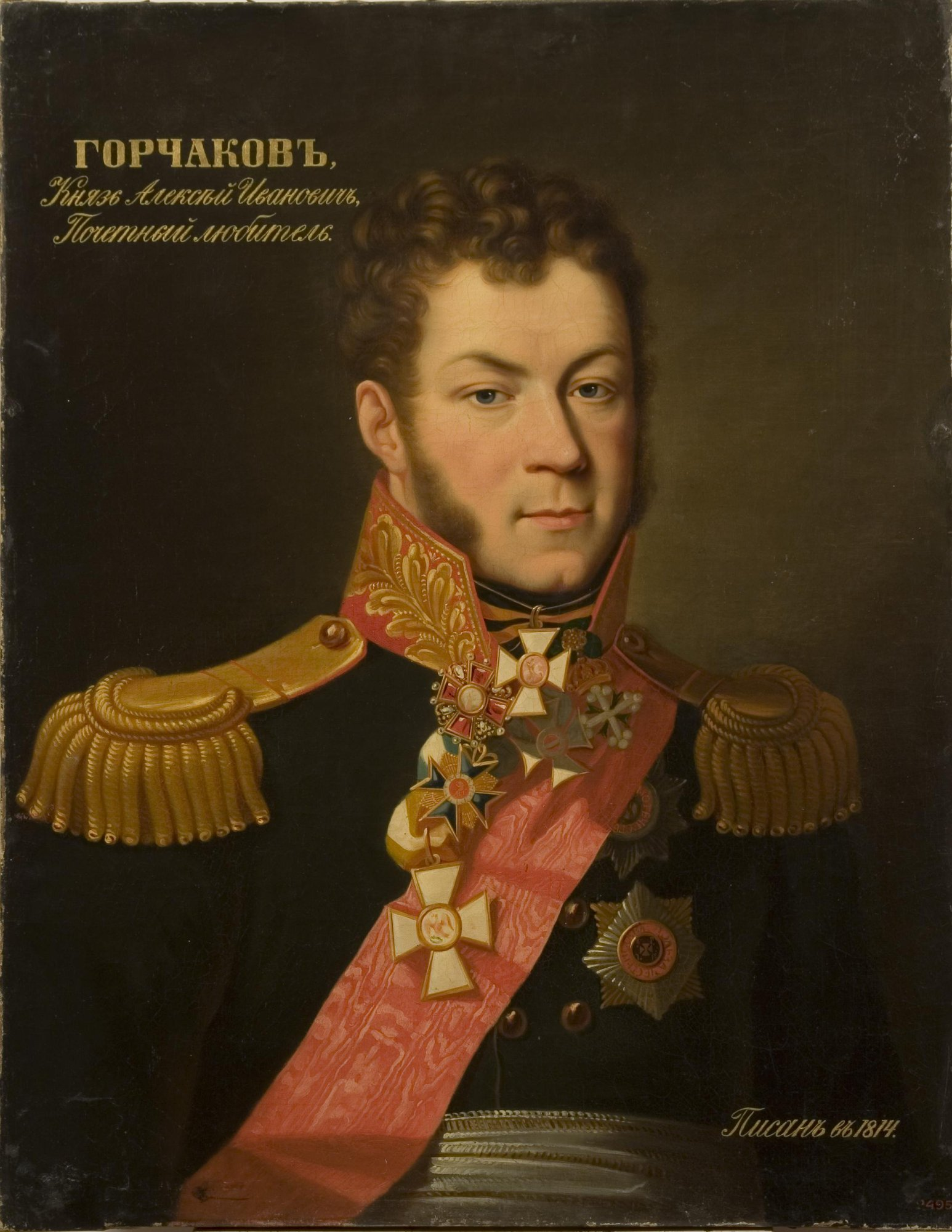

Aleksey Gorchakov was a son of Prince Ivan Gorchakov and a sister of the noted Russian generalissimo Alexander Suvorov. Born in Moscow, he enlisted in the Life Guard Preobrazhensky Regiment in 1774, and began his service several years later in 1781. In 1786 he entered the regular army as a captain and served with distinction (as an adjudant) under his uncle Suvorov in the Turkish War of 1787–92. Gorchakov distinguished himself in the campaigns of 1789 at Akkerman, at Ochakov, the latter for which he received the Order of St. George (4th class) as well as being promoted to lieutenant colonel and becoming an adjudant to Prince Potemkin, at Kaumany, at Bender and in the campaign of 1790. In 1790 he was promoted to colonel of Azov regiment. In 1792 he fought in the Poland (Polish–Russian War of 1792) and received the Order of St. Vladimir (4th class).

Gorchakov took part as a general officer in the Italian and Swiss operations of 1799 together with general Rimsky-Korsakov. He returned to Russia afterwards, and became chef of the Neva Musketeer Regiment on 7 February 1800, while serving as the governor of Vryborg as well as the chef of the Vryborg Garrison regiment between March and August in 1800. He then served in the next war against Napoleon in Poland in 1806–1807 (Battle of Heilsberg). He succeeded Barclay de Tolly as the Minister of War in August 1812, and was promoted to general of the infantry on 11 September 1814. Removed from command in December 1815 after another accusation of "embezzlement", he took a discharge in September 1817. Aleksey Gorchakov died in December 1817 in St. Petersburg.

== Family ==
His brother Andrei Ivanovich Gorchakov (1776–1855) was a general in the Russian army who took a conspicuous part in the final campaigns against Napoleon. Their cousin Princess Pelageya Nikolayevna Gorchakova (1762–1838) was fictionalized by her grandson Leo Tolstoy in War and Peace.

Preceded by Michael Andreas Barclay de Tolly	Minister of Land Forces; 1812 – 1815	Succeeded by Pyotr Konovnitsyn

== Sources ==
- Mikaberidze, Alexander (2005). Russian Officer Corps of the Revolutionary and Napoleonic Wars. Casemate Publishers. pp. 135–136. ISBN 978-1611210026.
