= Saltanawka, Mogilev region =

Village in Mogilev Region, Belarus

Saltanawka Салтанаўка (Belarusian) Салтановка (Russian)
- Village
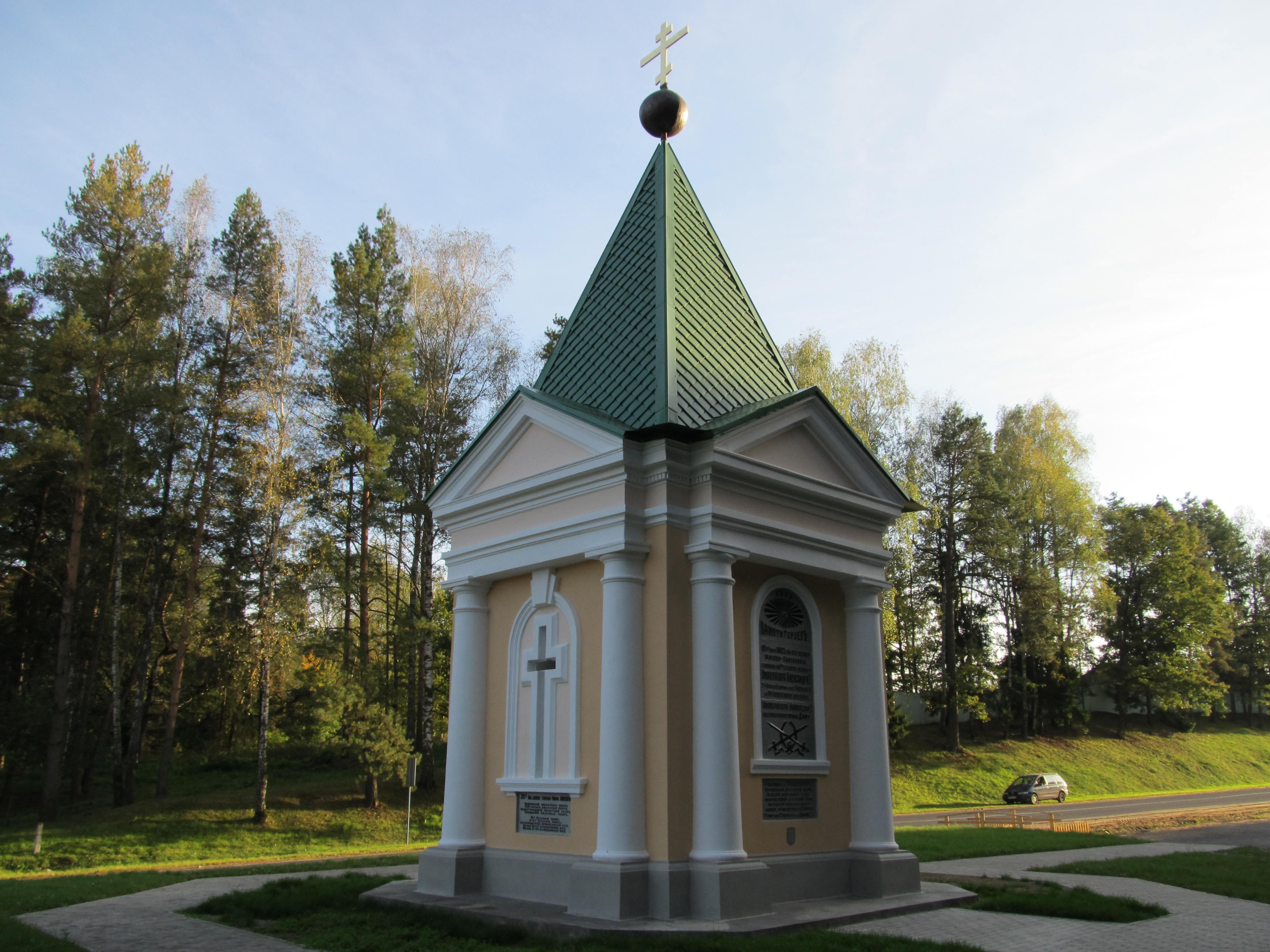

- Location within Belarus
- Coordinates: 53°48′01″N 30°15′20″E
- Country: Belarus
- Region: Mogilev Region
- District: Mogilev District
- Time zone: UTC+3 (MSK)

Saltanawka (Belarusian: Салтанаўка, romanized: Saltanaŭka; Russian: Салтановка, romanized: Saltanovka) is a village in Mogilev District, Mogilev Region, Belarus. It is part of Dashkawka selsoviet.

== History ==
On 23 July 1812, Russian forces led by Pyotr Bagration and Nikolay Raevsky were defeated at the Battle of Saltanovka during the French invasion of Russia.
