= Beshankovichy =

Urban-type settlement in Vitebsk Region, Belarus

Beshankovichy Бешанковічы (Belarusian) Бешенковичи (Russian)
- Urban-type settlement
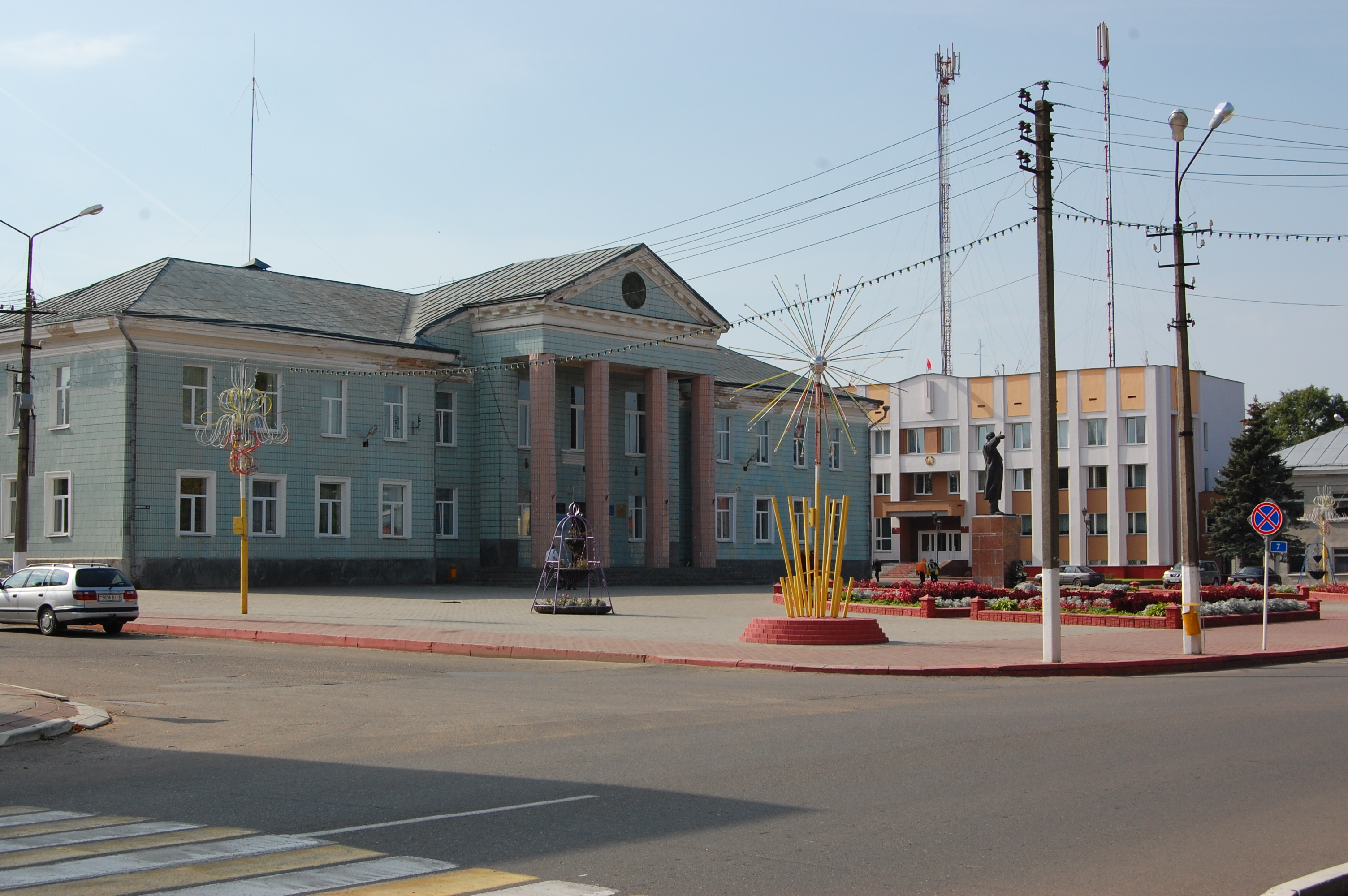

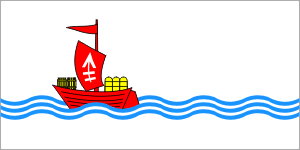
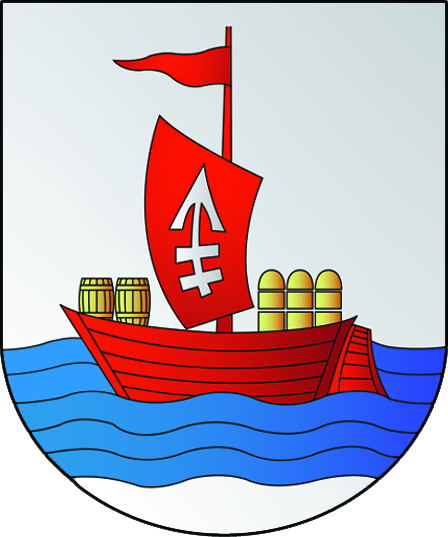
- Flag Coat of arms

- Location within Belarus
- Coordinates: 55°2′N 29°27′E
- Country: Belarus
- Region: Vitebsk Region
- District: Beshankovichy District
- First mentioned: 15th century
- Elevation: 142 m (466 ft)

Population (2025)
  - Total: 6,819
- Time zone: UTC+3 (MSK)
- Postal code: 211350
- Area code: +375 2131

Beshankovichy (Belarusian: Бешанковічы, romanized: Biešankovičy; Russian: Бешенковичи, romanized: Beshenkovichi; Polish: Bieszenkowicze) is an urban-type settlement in Vitebsk Region, Belarus. It serves as the administrative center of Beshankovichy District and is a port on the Western Dvina. It is located 51 kilometres (32 mi) west-southwest of Vitebsk on the railway line between Orsha and Lyepyel. As of 2025, it has a population of 6,819.

== History ==
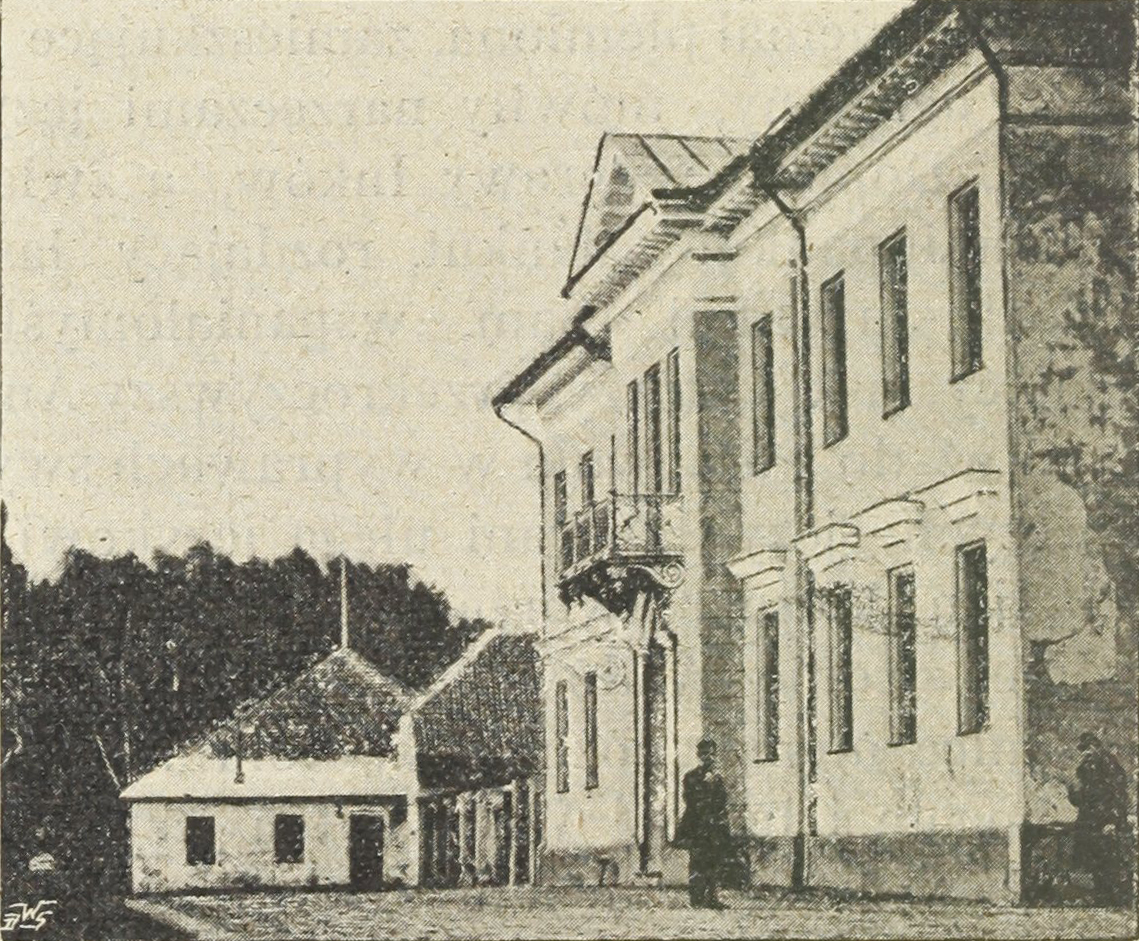
Chreptowicz Palace in c. 1903

In the early 16th century, the small village was part of the Grand Duchy of Lithuania ruled by the Drucki-Sokoliński princes. In 1552 it numbered 34 houses.

In 1630, the village was purchased by the Vilnius Voivode Kazimierz Leon Sapieha. It underwent rapid expansion and was granted Magdeburg rights in 1634. At that time, new stone houses were built and trade fairs were held semiannually, frequented by 4 to 5 thousand visitors from Belarus, Russia and abroad.

After the First Partition of Poland in 1772, control of the village was passed to the Russian Empire. By the end of the 18th century, Beshankovichy was a township of the Lepel Uyezd and later became the center of the volost.

According to the 1897 Russian census, the town's population was 4,423 people, there were 1,099 buildings, a post office, a telegraph, a school, 3 people's schools, 127 shops and a hospital.

At that time, Beshankovichy was a largely Jewish settlement, numbering 3,182 Jewish citizens in 1900. The Jewish Encyclopedia (published between 1901 and 1906), describes the town's population as four fifths Jewish of whom 576 are artisans. The town had a synagogue, many houses of prayer, three benevolent societies, and numerous religious schools.

Under Soviet power, Beshankovichy became an urban settlement and was the center of the raion for several years. It later became part of Vitebsk Region.

=== World War II ===
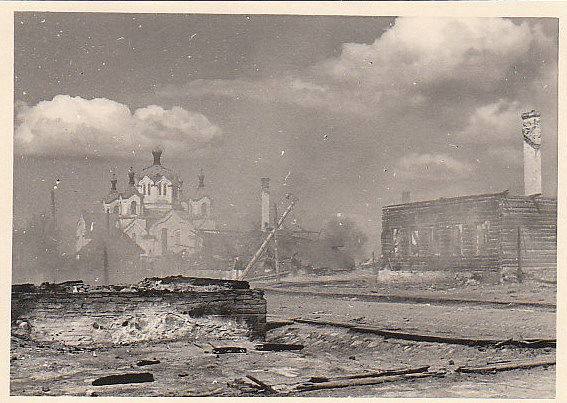
War destruction in 1941

In 1939, 1,119 Jews lived in the town, making up 26.3% of the total population. During the Second World War, Beshankovichy was under German military occupation from 6 July 1941 until 25 June 1944, and was almost entirely destroyed. 10,276 persons from Beshankovichy and the raion were massacred, including the entire Jewish population. A resident at the time of the German occupation recalled, "One Jewish family that had not been taken to the ghetto was still living on my street. When the Jews were being gathered for the shooting, the Germans came to get this family. A little Jewish boy was hiding in the fireplace. The Germans found him and shot him right there, in the house."

According to an Einsatzgruppe report, 855 Jews were killed in the town on 11 February 1942, while the inscription on the monument erected on the site of the murders says that 1,068 citizens were killed that day. A Nazi prison was operated in the town. The town was recaptured on 25 June 1944 by the 1st Baltic Front.

== Sources ==
- Megargee, Geoffrey P.; Dean, Martin (2012). The United States Holocaust Memorial Museum Encyclopedia of Camps and Ghettos 1933–1945. Volume II. Indiana University Press, United States Holocaust Memorial Museum. pp. 1647–1649. ISBN 978-0-253-35599-7.
