= Peter Graf von der Pahlen =

Russian general (1778–1864)

Peter Johann Christoph Graf von der Pahlen
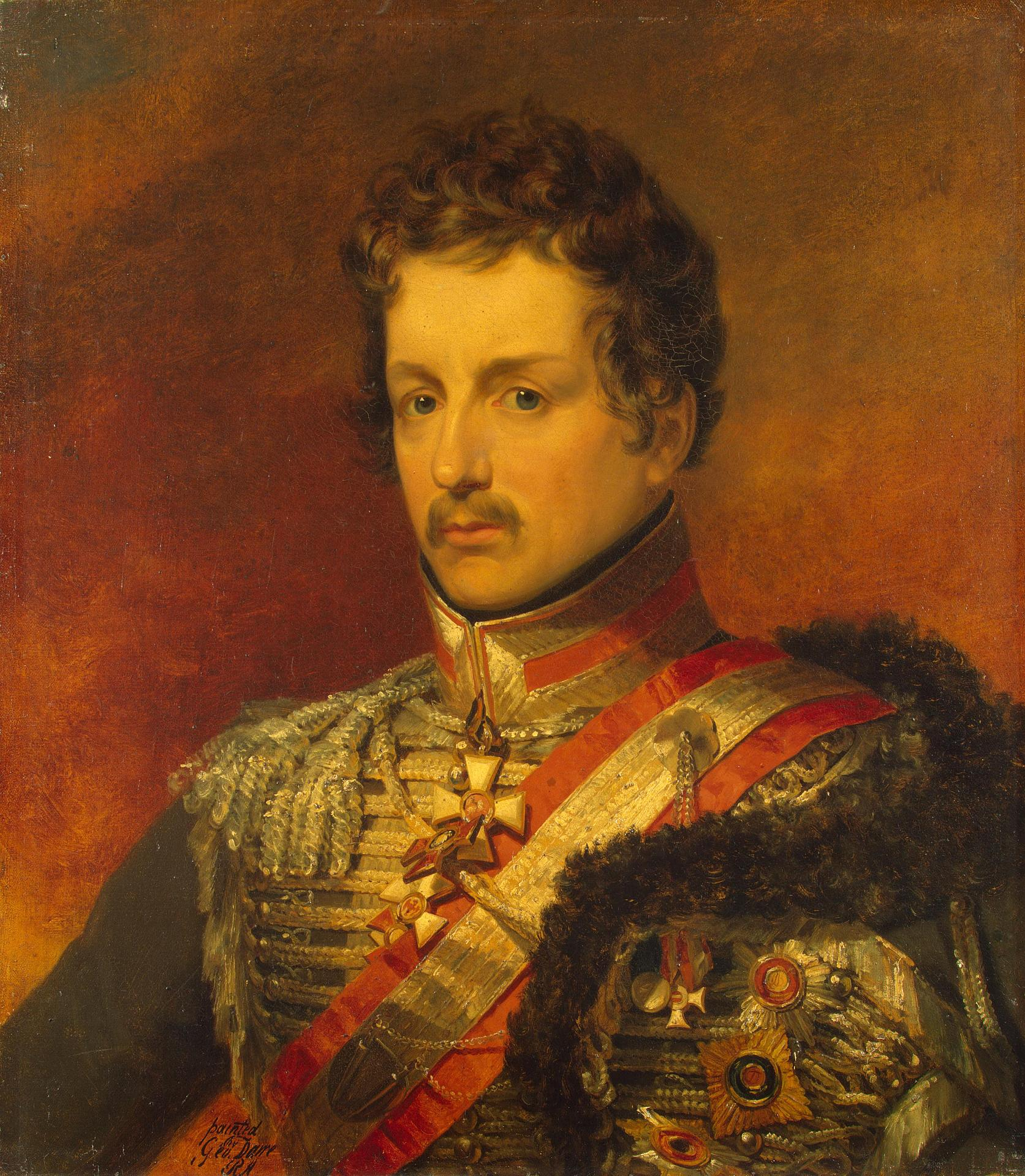
- Portrait by George Dawe, 1822–1825
- Born: 11 September 1778; Kaucminde Manor, Duchy of Courland and Semigallia
- Died: 1 May 1864 (aged 85); Saint Petersburg, Russia
- Relatives: Peter Ludwig von der Pahlen (father)
- Military career
- Allegiance: Russia
- Branch: Imperial Russian Army
- Service years: 1790–1823, 1828–1831
- Rank: Major general
- Conflicts: Napoleonic Wars; War of the Fourth Coalition; French invasion of Russia; Battle of Vitebsk (1812); War of the Sixth Coalition; Battle of Leipzig; Russo-Turkish War (1828–1829); November Uprising; Battle of Warsaw (1831)

Russian Ambassador to France
- In office 11 March 1835 – 8 April 1841
- Preceded by: Carlo Andrea Pozzo di Borgo
- Succeeded by: Nikolay Kiselyov

Peter Johann Christoph Graf von der Pahlen (Russian: Пётр Петрович Пален, romanized: Pyotr Petrovich Palen; 11 September [O.S. 31 August] 1778, Kauzmünde Manor, Kauzmünde (now Saulaine) – 1 May [O.S. 19 April] 1864, St. Petersburg) was a Baltic German aristocrat and a general of the Imperial Russian Army.

== Life ==
Peter was born into the Baltic German noble Pahlen family. His family had a baronetcy until Emperor Alexander I of Russia bestowed Peter's father, Peter Ludwig von der Pahlen, with the title count for him and his sons. His father was an organiser of the assassination of the tsar; Peter's brother was Russian diplomat Friedrich Alexander von der Pahlen.

Joining the army at an early age, Pahlen was promoted to colonel in 1798 and to major general in 1800.

Peahen was highly decorated for his command during the Polish campaign of the War of the Fourth Coalition during the Napoleonic Wars in 1806–1807. He fought against Napoleon in the Battle of Vitebsk in 1812, and in 1813 he fought at the major Battle of Leipzig. Having retired from service in 1823, he was recalled to the army in 1828 for the Russo-Turkish War. He also was a high-ranking Russian commander during the subsequent November Uprising, and notably the Battle of Warsaw in 1831.

Pahlen also served as Russian ambassador to the Kingdom of France from 11 March 1835 to 8 April 1841.

== See also ==
- Battle of Vitebsk (1812)
