= Rylsky Uyezd =

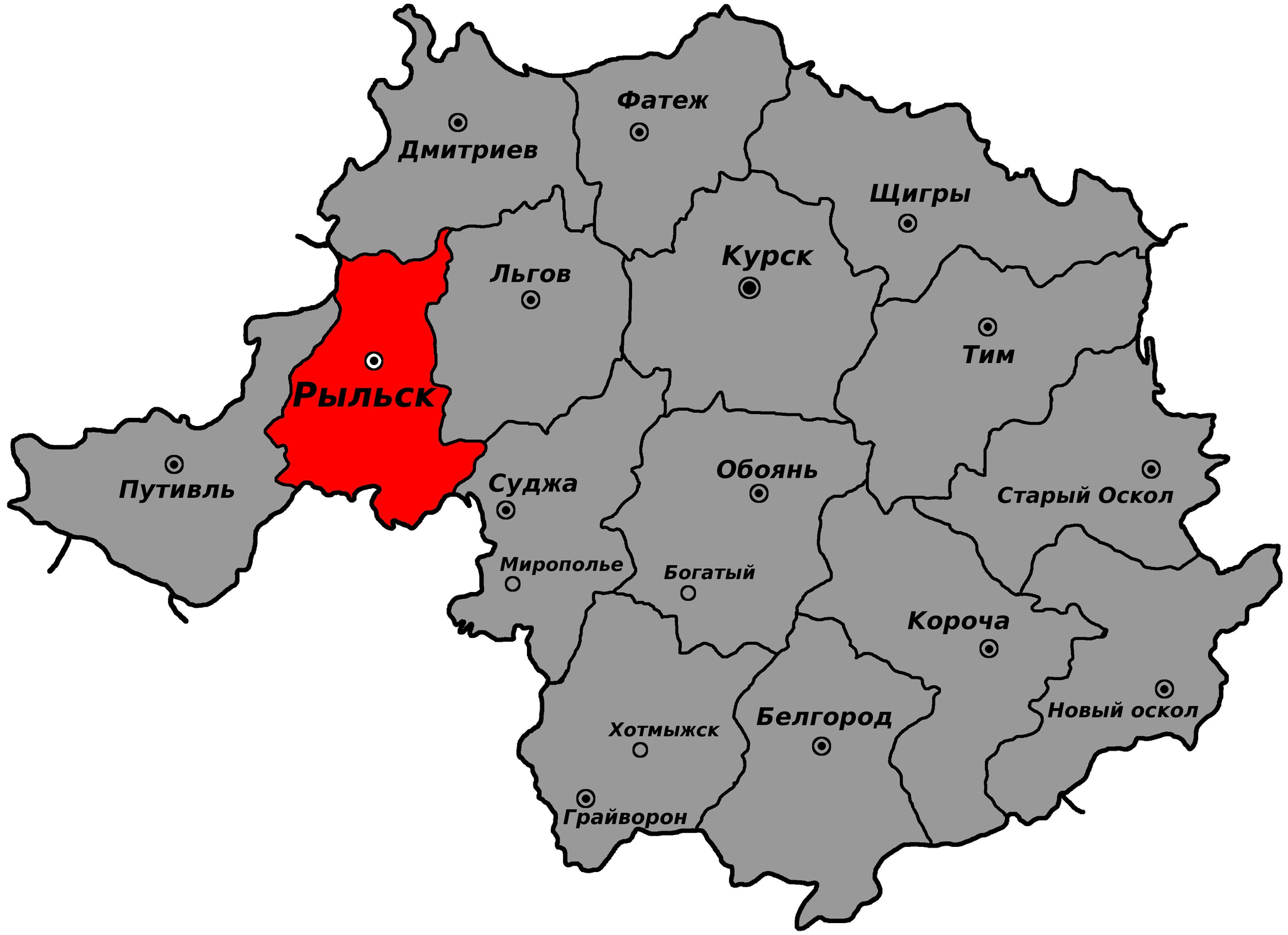
map of Rylsky uyezd

Rylsky Uyezd (Russian: Ры́льский уе́зд; Ukrainian: Рильський повіт, romanized: Rylskyi povit) was one of the subdivisions of the Kursk Governorate of the Russian Empire. It was situated in the western part of the governorate. Its administrative centre was Rylsk.

== Demographics ==
At the time of the Russian Empire Census of 1897, Rylsky Uyezd had a population of 164,368. Of these, 68.5% spoke Russian, 31.0% Ukrainian, 0.2% Yiddish, 0.2% Belarusian, 0.1% Polish and 0.1% German as their native language.
