= Astrowna =

Astrowna Астроўна (Belarusian)
- Agrotown
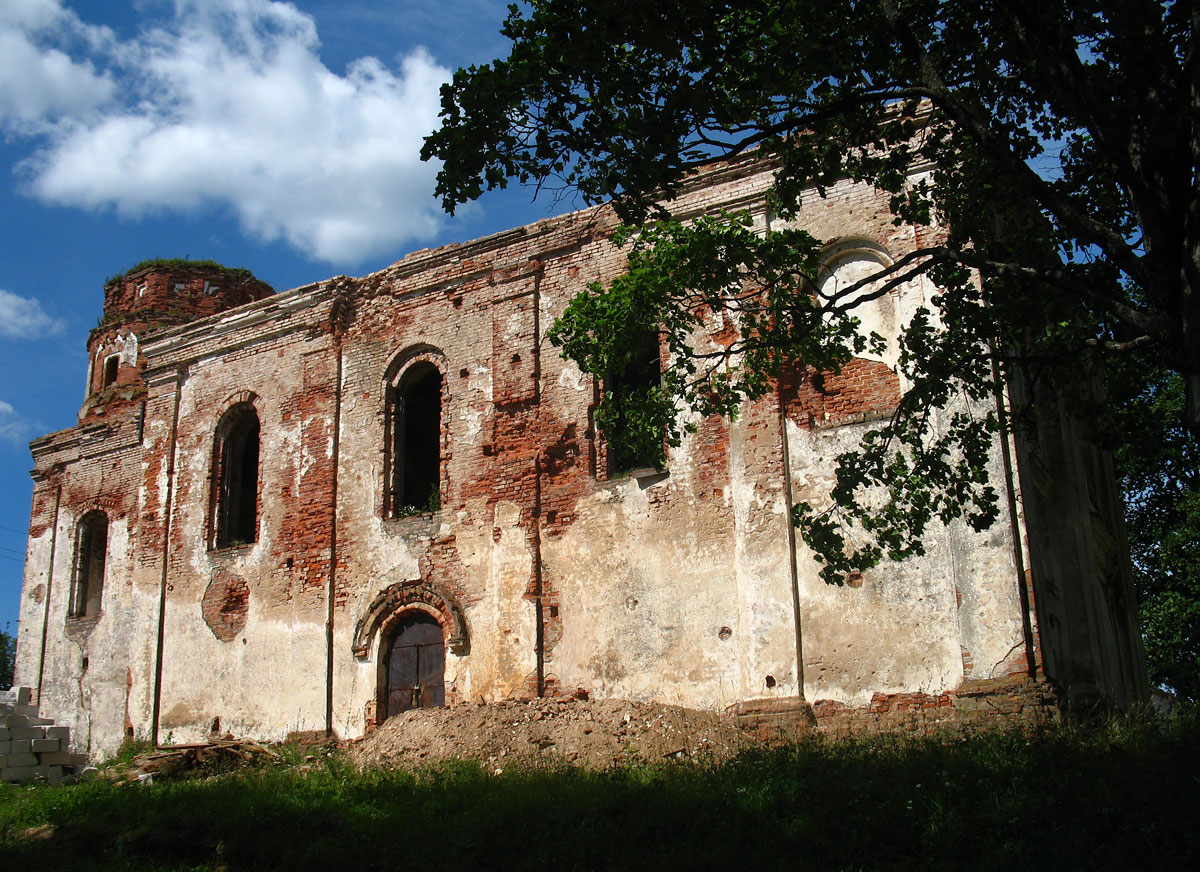
- Church of the Holy Trinity

- Location within Belarus
- Coordinates: 55°07′37″N 29°51′56″E
- Country: Belarus
- Region: Vitebsk Region
- District: Beshankovichy District

Population (2010)
  - Total: 603
- Time zone: UTC+3 (MSK)
- Postal code: 211364
- Area code: +375 2131

Astrowna or Ostrovno (Belarusian: Астроўна, romanized: Astroŭna; Russian: Островно; Polish: Ostrowno) is an agrotown in Beshankovichy District, Vitebsk Region, Belarus. It is located 15 kilometres (9.3 mi) west of Vitebsk.

Astrowna is a birthplace of Lew Sapieha, a statesman of the Polish–Lithuanian Commonwealth and the creator of the Third Lithuanian Statute.

== History ==
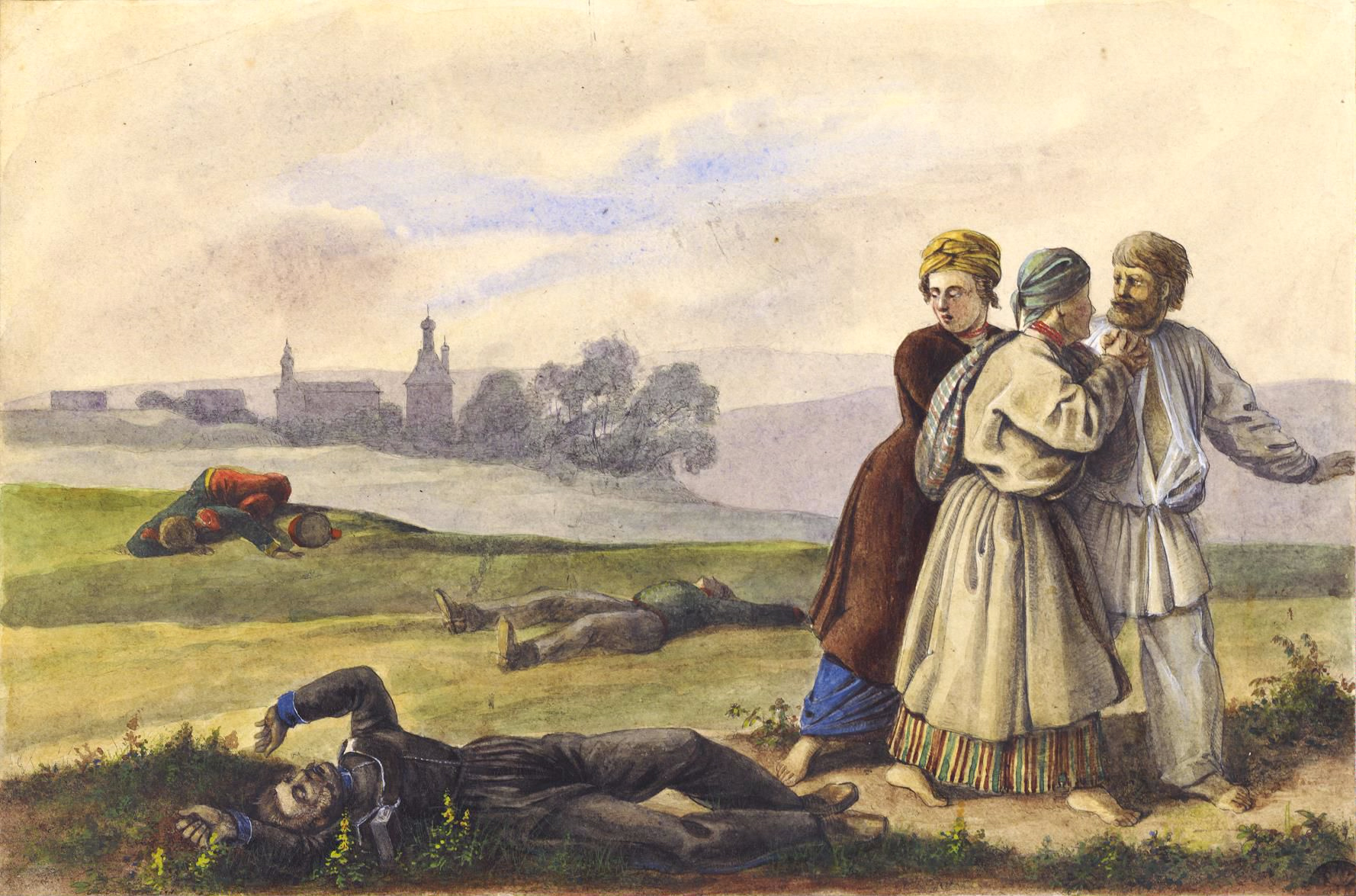
Near Astroŭna by C. Faber du Faur, August 1, 1812.

Astrowna was founded as a castle of Iwan Bohdanowicz Sapieha between years 1520 and 1530. At that time the land belonged to Palonnaja manor of Vitebsk powiat of the Grand Duchy of Lithuania and was inherited by Ivan and his stepbrother Janush from their mother, duchess Feodora Druck-Sakalinskaja. In 1546, a village was founded near the castle. For the next hundred years or so Astrowna was a property of Sapieha family.

In 1622, a Dominican monastery was founded by Alexander Sapieha. After his death part of the manor was inherited by his daughter Anna and her husband Stanislaw Narushevich.

In 1772, Astrowna became a part of the Russian Empire in the course of the First Partition of Poland. In 1812, the Battle of Ostrovno took place on the outskirts of the village between the French and Russian armies.

At the end of the 19th century, there were about 70 houses in the village, in the beginning of the 20th century — there were about 120 houses. After the October Revolution, Astrowna became a part of the Byelorussian Soviet Socialist Republic.

After Belarusian independence in 1991, it was administered as a village in Beshankovichy District. In 2005, Astrowna joined the state program for rural development and became an agrotown.

== Notable people ==
- Lew Sapieha (1557, Astrowna estate (now village) – 1633), a nobleman and statesman of the Polish–Lithuanian Commonwealth, governor of Slonim, Brest, and Mahiliow
