= Amber Declaration =

1914 document advocating Lithuanian unity

- Created: 17 August 1914
- Author(s): Jonas Basanavičius, Stasys Šilingas, Donatas Malinauskas
- Signatories: Jonas Basanavičius and Donatas Malinauskas
- Purpose: Express loyalty to the Russian Empire and hopes of unification of Lithuania Minor and Lithuania Proper

The Amber Declaration (Lithuanian: Gintarinė deklaracija), also known as the Lithuanian Declaration, is a document adopted by the right-wing Lithuanian activists in Vilnius on 17 August 1914, just few weeks after the start of World War I.

The declaration was written by Jonas Basanavičius, Stasys Šilingas, and Donatas Malinauskas. It declared loyalty of the Lithuanian nation to the Russian Empire and expressed hopes of Lithuanian autonomy and unification of the Lutheran Lithuania Minor and Catholic Lithuania Proper under the Russian rule. The declaration was printed in the press and presented to Russian officials, but failed to elicit an official response and drew criticism from the left-wing Lithuanian activists. Nevertheless, it is valued for raising Lithuanian aspirations and emphasizing the distinction between Lithuanians and Poles.

The declaration earned its name after a statement that compared ethnic Lithuania to an amber necklace which was torn apart by Germany's historical Drang nach Osten.

== Background ==
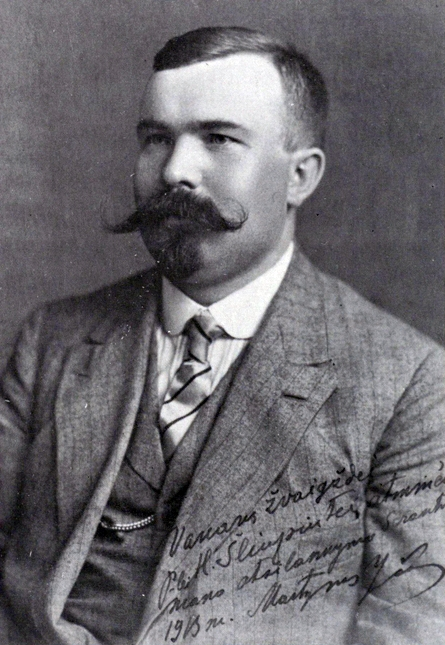
Lithuanian politician Martynas Yčas delivered the Amber Declaration to the Russian government

World War I broke out in July 1914. On 2 August, Tsar Nicholas II issued a manifesto on the Russian entry into World War I in which he called on all subjects to unite and defend Russia's honor and integrity. Grand Duke Nicholas Nikolaevich, chief commander of the Russian forces, issued the Manifesto to the Polish Nation on 14 August 1914 which made vague promises of autonomy for Poland and return of Polish lands once annexed by Germany and Austria-Hungary.

Lithuanians reacted to the war by declaring loyalty and support to the Russian war effort. They were also hoping to receive similar promises of autonomy as Poland. Martynas Yčas, in a 8 August speech to the State Duma, speaking on behalf of all Lithuanians, declared that Lithuanians supported the war effort, had already defeated the Germans (allusion to the 1410 Battle of Grunwald), and hoped to reunite all Lithuanians under the Russian flag. Historian Aldona Gaigalaitė argued that Yčas did not come up with these talking points alone – essentially the same points were elaborated upon in the declaration drafted by Jonas Basanavičius, Stasys Šilingas, and Donatas Malinauskas. It was approved on 17 August [O.S. 4 August] 1914 during a gathering of right-wing Lithuanian activists in Vilnius. The declaration was signed only by Jonas Basanavičius and Donatas Malinauskas.

Other nations within the Russian Empire—including Estonians, Latvians, and Armenians—drafted similar declarations of loyalty.

== Content ==
The Lithuanian Declaration declared loyalty to the Russian Empire. It declared that "the common task of Lithuanian and Slav warriors is to combat the all-devouring Germanism". It mentioned the 1410 Battle of Grunwald as proof of historical unity between Slavs and Balts fighting against a common enemy (i.e. the Germans) – the battle was invoked in the Manifesto to the Polish Nation. It reflected the belief that Polonisation and Germanisation were more dangerous to the Lithuanians than Russification. It also reflected the expectations that Russia would win the war which would last just a few months.

Further, the declaration expressed Lithuania's political interests. It referred to Lithuania Minor (part of the German East Prussia) as part of Samogitia that was torn away by Germans, and expressed hopes that the two could be reunited. Beneath the loudly proclaimed loyalty, the declaration carefully raised arguments for Lithuania's autonomy: Lithuanians are not Slavs (neither Poles, nor Russians) and are culturally distinct, they have political goals and memory of the historic Grand Duchy of Lithuania.

== Distribution ==
Liudas Noreika brought the declaration from Vilnius to Saint Petersburg so that Martynas Yčas, member of the State Duma, could present it to Russian officials. Yčas edited the declaration to reduce its poetic rhetoric and, hoping to provoke a reaction, added an explanation that only the Russian government could inform the Prussian Lithuanians about the plans for unification with Lithuania thus lessening their resistance to the Russian forces.

Yčas presented it to the Tsar, Grand Duke Nicholas Nikolaevich, Prime Minister Ivan Goremykin (in person), Chairman of the State Council Mikhail Akimov, and Chairman of the State Duma Mikhail Rodzianko. Goremykin called it nonsense, and only Rodzianko sent a short thank-you note. Therefore, Lithuanians failed to elicit any positive reaction to the declaration from Russian officials.

The unedited version of the declaration was published in the press: Vilenskiy vestnik on 2 September, Novoye Vremya and Viltis on 4 September, Rygos garsas on 9 September, Šaltinis on 12 September, and others. The declaration's text is known from these publications as the edited version presented to Russian officials has not been found.

== Reactions ==
The declaration was written and adopted by right-wing activists. The left-wing disapproved it. For example, the Social Democratic Party of Lithuania believed that only a revolution could bring freedom to Lithuania. During a secret meeting of all political parties on 7 September [O.S. 25 August] 1914, it was acknowledged that the Amber Declaration was not acceptable to all, but it should be not be criticized in public. It was decided that similar proclamations should be adopted by a political committee representing all parties. However, efforts to establish such a committee failed to due disagreements. The issue of Lithuanian autonomy could be discussed more freely by Lithuanians abroad, particularly the Lithuanian Americans and Juozas Gabrys.

Lithuanian historiography, particularly during the Soviet period, viewed the declaration negatively due to its unconditional loyalty to the Russian Empire (the issue of Lithuanian autonomy had already been raised by the Great Seimas of Vilnius in 1905).

== Bibliography ==
- Balkelis, Tomas (2018). War, Revolution, and Nation-making in Lithuania, 1914-1923. Oxford University Press. ISBN 978-0-19-966802-1.
- Błaszczak, Tomasz; Bulota, Rytis (2026). "Nearing Independence. The Projects for the Lithuanian State before 1918". In Bianchini, Stefano (ed.). Transnational Balkans and Central Europe. Dynamics of Integration and Rejections, 1800–2015. De Gruyter Brill. ISBN 9783112225295.
- Iškauskas, Česlovas (25 October 2014). "Č. Iškauskas. Skaldyta ir skaldoma Lietuva: kas gresia jos vientisumui?". Delfi.lt (in Lithuanian).
- Gaigalaitė, Aldona (2006). Lietuvos atstovai Rusijos valstybės dūmoje 1906–1917 metais. Didysis Lietuvos parlamentarų biografinis žodynas (in Lithuanian). Vilnius: Vilniaus pedagoginio universiteto leidykla. ISBN 9955-20-066-9.
- Griffante, Andrea (2014). "We and Homeland: German Occupation, Lithuanian Discourse, and War Experience in Ober Ost". In Bürgschwentner, Joachim; Egger, Matthias; Barth-Scalmani, Gunda (eds.). Other Fronts, Other Wars?: First World War Studies on the Eve of the Centennial. Brill. ISBN 978-90-04-27951-3.
- Grigaravičius, Algirdas (2017). Atsiskyrėlis iš Suvalkijos. Jono Basanavičiaus gyvenimas ir darbai (in Lithuanian). Vol. I. Versus aureus. ISBN 978-9955-34-641-8.
- Kasparavičius, Algimantas (24 February 2013). "Karas, kuriame gimė Vasario 16-oji (radijo paskaita)". lrt.lt (in Lithuanian).
- Lopata, Raimundas (1991). "Lietuvių inteligentijos politinė veikla 1914–1915 metais" (PDF). Lietuvių atgimimo istorijos studijos (in Lithuanian). 3: 231–252, 492, 501–502. ISSN 1392-0391.
- Lopata, Raimundas (1996). "Lietuvos valstybingumo raida 1914–1918 metais" (PDF). Lietuvių atgimimo istorijos studijos (in Lithuanian). 9. ISSN 1392-0391.
- Lopata, Raimundas (1997). Nepriklausomybės akto signataras Donatas Malinauskas (in Lithuanian). Voruta. ISBN 9986-510-20-1. OCLC 39133961.
- Spečiūnas, Vytautas (5 August 2024) [2018]. "Gintarinė deklaracija". Visuotinė lietuvių enciklopedija (in Lithuanian). Mokslo ir enciklopedijų leidybos centras.
- Sperskienė, Rasa (2014). "Gintarinė deklaracija". Lietuvos visuomenė Pirmojo pasaulinio karo pradžioje: įvykiai, draugijos, asmenybės (in Lithuanian). Lietuvos mokslų akademijos Vrublevskių biblioteka.
- "Nepaprastasis valstybęs dūmos posėdis". Viltis (in Lithuanian). Vol. 168, no. 1116. 30 July 1914. pp. 1–2.
- Yčas, Martynas (2009). Iš Agaro krašto: 1885–1941 (PDF) (in Lithuanian). Kaunas: Candela. ISBN 978-9986-400-21-9.
