= St. Michael the Archangel Church (Cannes) =

Russian Orthodox church in Cannes, France

Coordinates: 43°32′46″N 7°02′23″E

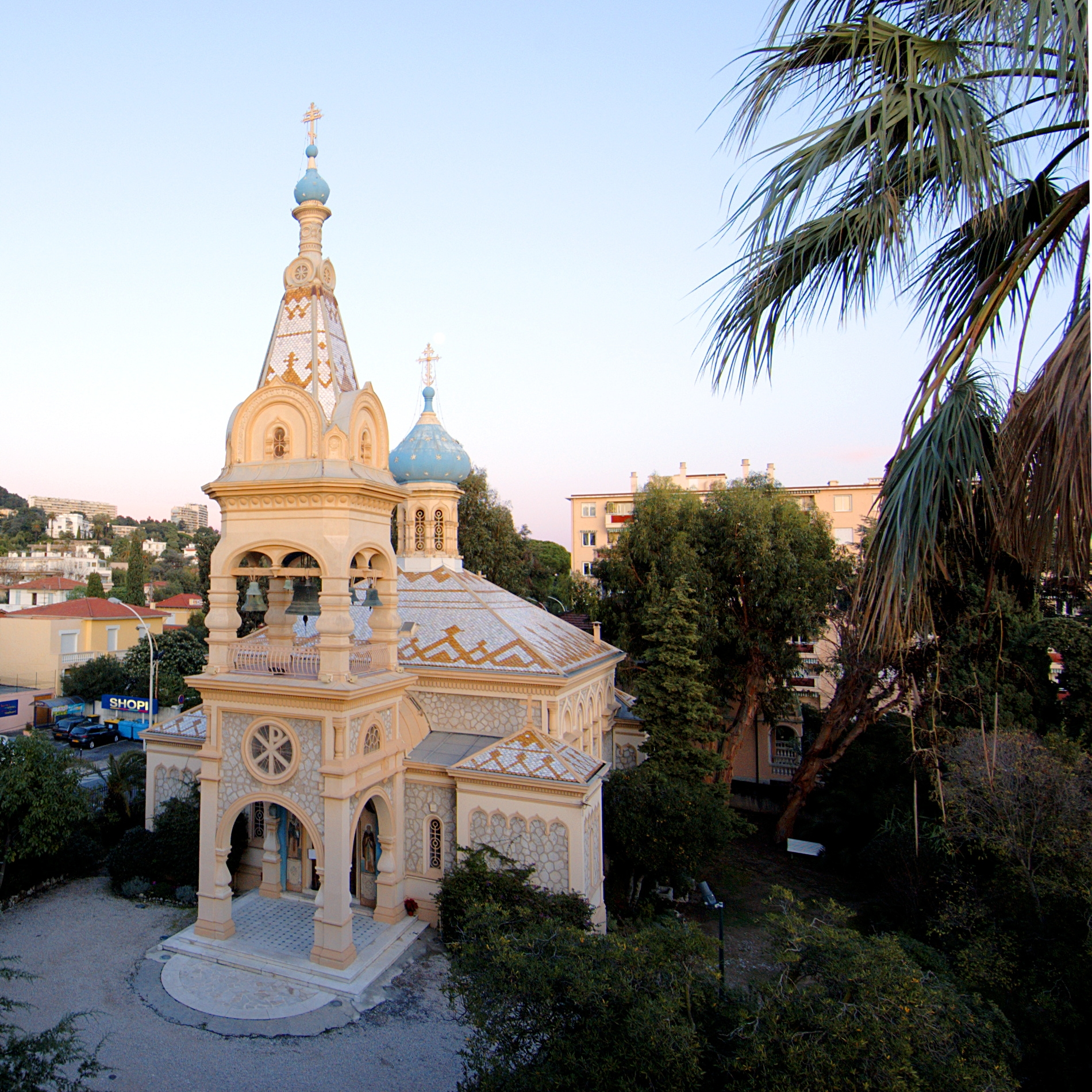
St. Michael the Archangel Church, Cannes

St. Michael the Archangel Church, Cannes is an Eastern Orthodox church in Cannes, France (40 Boulevard Alexandre III). It was built in 1894. The parish of the church has been, for most of its history, under the jurisdiction of the Archdiocese of Russian Orthodox churches in Western Europe, an exarchate of the Ecumenical Patriarchate of Constantinople from 1931 until November 2018; in September 2019, the parish switched to the jurisdiction of the Moscow Patriarchate.

== History ==
The foundation of the church building was laid with the blessing of Metropolitan of St. Petersburg Palladiy (Raev) on 23 April (5 May) 1894. The building was designed by the architect Louis Nouveau.

It was consecrated on 22 November (4 December) of the same year. The parish received donations from members of the Russian Imperial Family.

After the inauguration of the church the Cannes municipality re-named the street where the church was located after Emperor Alexander III (boulevard Alexandre III)

In 1921, the exiled Grand Duke Andrei Vladimirovich of Russia and ballet dancer Mathilde Kschessinska, the prima ballerina of the St. Petersburg Imperial Theatre, were wed here.

The crypt of the church has been the place of burial of a number of notable Russian exiles. Until April 2015, this was where Grand Duke Nicholas Nikolaevich and his wife Princess Anastasia of Montenegro were interred (re-buried in Moscow, at the Bratsky military cemetery in May 2015). Still buried here are: Duke Peter Alexandrovich of Oldenburg and Grand Duke Peter Nikolaevich along with his wife Princess Milica of Montenegro.
