= Grand Duke Nicholas Nikolaevich of Russia (born 1856) =

Russian grand duke and general (1856–1929)

Grand Duke Nicholas Nikolaevich Nicholas III
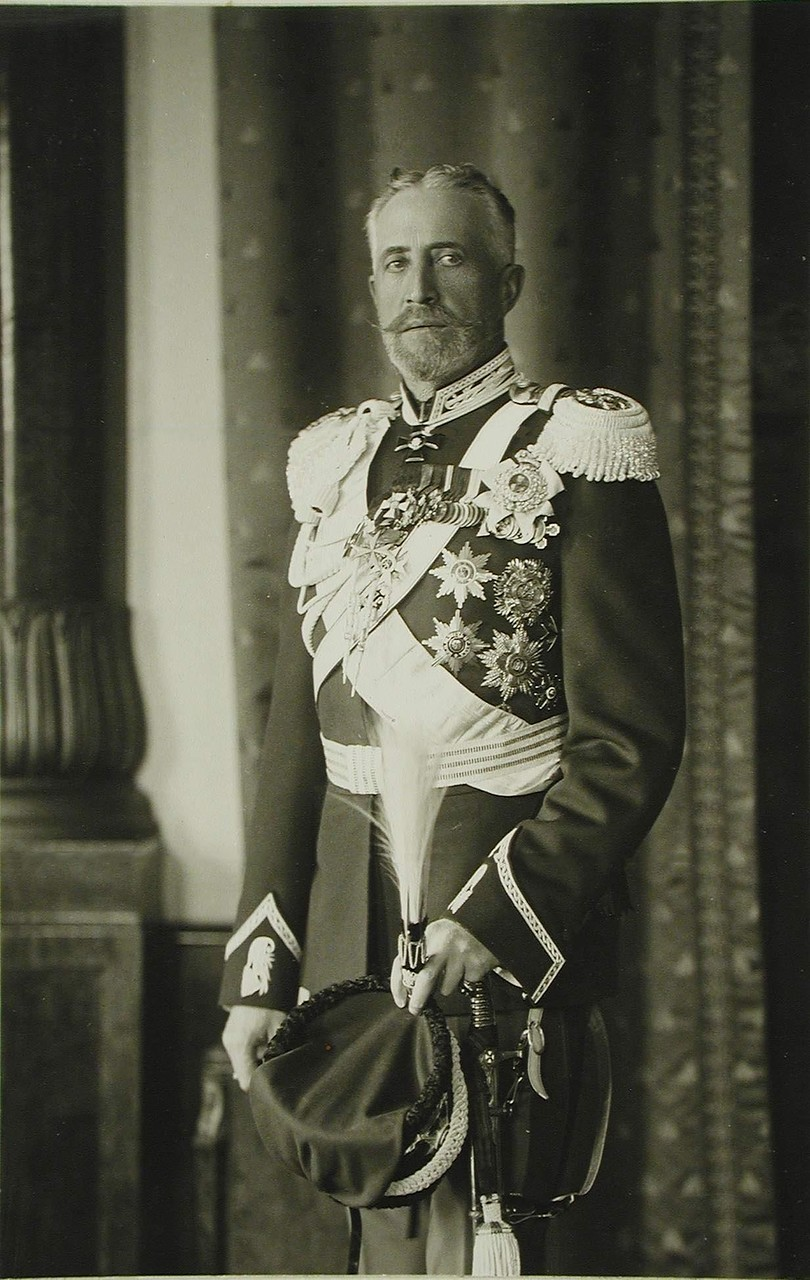

Emperor of Russia (disputed)
- Reign: July 1922 – 16 June 1923
- Predecessor: Nicholas II
- Successor: Monarchy abolished
Military positions
Commander of the Caucasus Military District
In office 30 August 1914 – 16 February 1917
Monarch	Nicholas II
Minister of War	Vladimir Sukhomlinov; Alexei Polivanov; Dmitry Shuvayev; Mikhail Belyayev
Preceded by	Illarion Vorontsov-Dashkov
Succeeded by	Alexander Myshlayevsky
Viceroy of the Caucasus Viceroyalty
In office 13 September 1915 – 22 March 1917
Monarch	Nicholas II
Preceded by	Illarion Vorontsov-Dashkov
Succeeded by	Position abolished
Supreme Commander of the Stavka of the Russian Empire
In office 31 July 1914 – 23 August 1915
Monarch	Nicholas II
Preceded by	Position created
Succeeded by	Nicholas II
Supreme Commander of the Stavka of the Russian Provisional Government
In office 15 March 1917 – 24 March 1917
President of the Provisional Government	Georgy Lvov
Preceded by	Nicholas II
Succeeded by	Mikhail Alekseyev
Commander of the Saint Petersburg Military District
In office 8 November 1905 – 2 August 1914
Monarch	Nicholas II
Minister of War	Alexander Roediger; Vladimir Sukhomlinov
Preceded by	Grand Duke Vladimir Alexandrovich of Russia
Succeeded by	Nikolai Pavlovich von Asheberg (acting)
Supreme Commander of the Russian Forces Chairman of the Russian All-Military Union
In office 16 November 1928 – 5 January 1929 Serving with Pyotr Wrangel
Preceded by	Pyotr Wrangel
Succeeded by	Alexander Kutepov
- Born: 18 November 1856 Gregorian calendar (6 November 1856 Julian calendar); St. Petersburg, Russian Empire
- Died: 5 January 1929 (aged 72); Antibes, France
- Burial: St. Michael the Archangel Church (1929–2015); Chapel of the Transfiguration of Our Lord, Bratsky military cemetery, Moscow (since 2015)
- Spouse: Princess Anastasia of Montenegro (m. 1907)
Names
- Nicholas Nikolaevich Romanov
- House: Holstein-Gottorp-Romanov
- Father: Grand Duke Nicholas Nikolaevich of Russia
- Mother: Duchess Alexandra of Oldenburg
- Occupation: Commander in Chief of the Russian Imperial Army

Grand Duke Nicholas Nikolaevich of Russia (Russian: Николай Николаевич Романов (младший – the younger); 18 November 1856 – 5 January 1929) was a Russian grand duke and World War I general, a son of Grand Duke Nicholas Nikolaevich of Russia and a grandson of Emperor Nicholas I. He was commander-in-chief of the Imperial Russian Army units on the main front in the first year of the war, during the reign of his first cousin once removed, Emperor Nicholas II. Although held in high regard by Paul von Hindenburg, he struggled with the colossal task of leading Russia's war effort against Germany, including strategy, tactics, logistics and coordination with the government. After the Gorlice–Tarnów offensive in 1915, Tsar Nicholas replaced the Grand Duke as commander-in-chief of the army. He later was a successful commander-in-chief in the Caucasus region. He was briefly recognized as emperor in 1922 in areas controlled by the White movement in the Russian Far East.

== Biography ==
=== Family ===
A very tall man at 1.98 m (6 ft 6 in), Nicholas, named after his paternal grandfather, the emperor, was born as the eldest son to Grand Duke Nicholas Nikolaevich of Russia (1831–1891) and Duchess Alexandra of Oldenburg (1838–1900) on 18 November 1856. His father was the sixth child and third son born to Nicholas I of Russia and his wife, Empress Alexandra Feodorovna (1798–1860). Alexandra Fedorovna was a daughter of Frederick William III of Prussia and Louise of Mecklenburg-Strelitz.

Grand Duke Nicholas was the first cousin once removed of Tsar Nicholas II. To distinguish between them, the Grand Duke was often known within the Imperial family as "Nikolasha": the Grand Duke was also known as "Nicholas the Tall" while the tsar was "Nicholas the Short".

=== Early military career ===
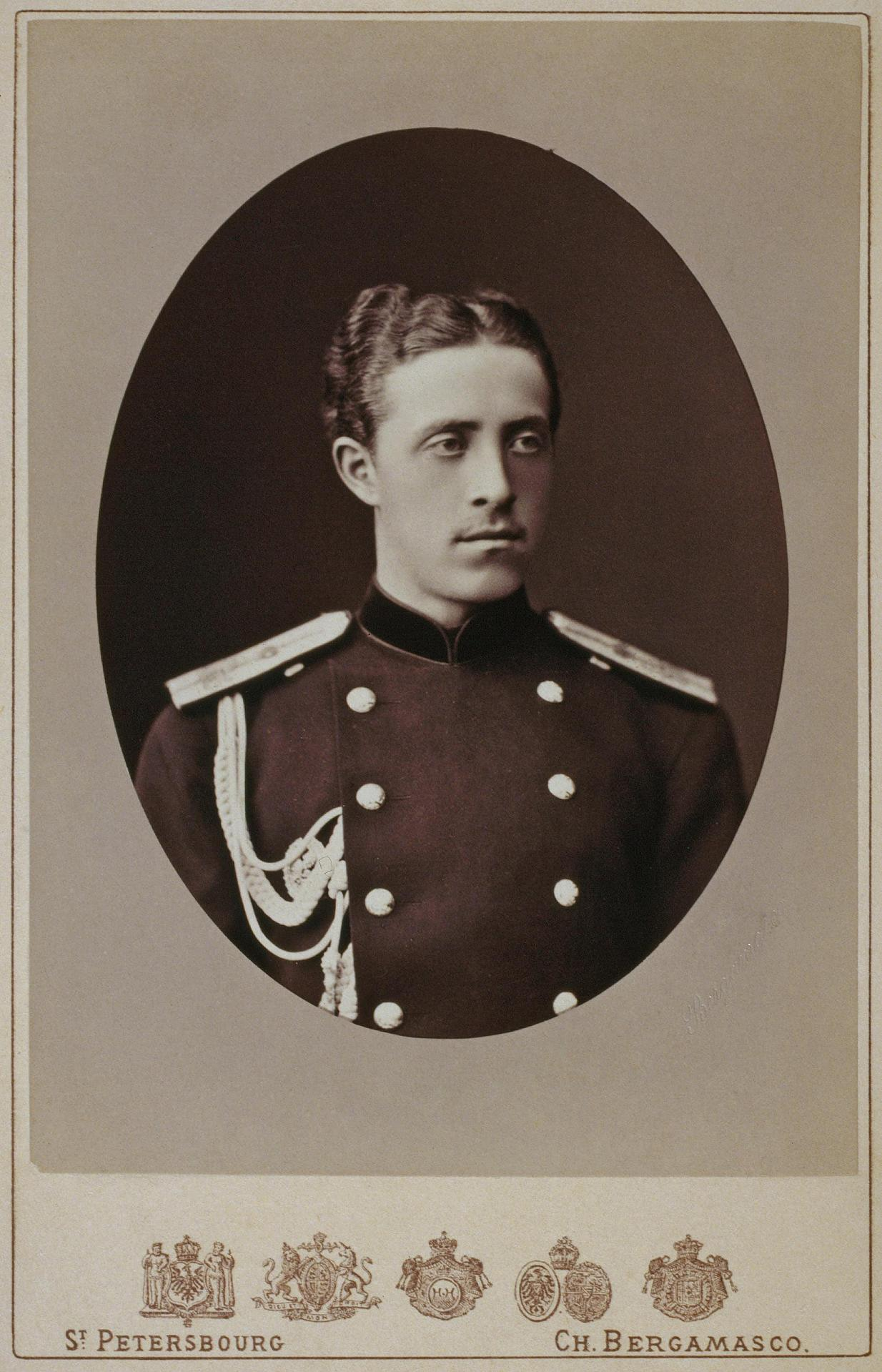
Grand Duke Nicholas in 1870

Grand Duke Nicholas was educated at the school of military engineers and received his commission in 1873. During the Russo-Turkish War (1877–1878), he was on the staff of his father who was commander in chief. He distinguished himself on two occasions in this war. He worked his way up through all the ranks until he was appointed commander of the Guard Hussar Regiment in 1884.

He had a reputation as a tough commander, yet one respected by his troops. His experience was more as a trainer of soldiers than a leader in battle. Nicholas was a very religious man, praying in the morning and at night as well as before and after meals.

By 1895, he was inspector-general of the cavalry, a post he held for 10 years. His tenure has been judged a success with reforms in training, cavalry schools, cavalry reserves and the remount services. He was not given an active command during the Russo-Japanese War, perhaps because the tsar did not wish to hazard the prestige of the Romanovs and because he wanted a loyal general in command at home in case of domestic disturbances. Thus, Nicholas did not have the opportunity to gain experience in battlefield command.

Grand Duke Nicholas played a crucial role during the Revolution of 1905. With disorder spreading and the future of the dynasty at stake, the tsar had a choice of instituting the reforms suggested by Count Sergei Witte or imposing a military dictatorship. The only man with the prestige to keep the allegiance of the army in such a coup was the grand duke. The tsar asked him to assume the role of a military dictator. In an emotional scene at the palace, Nicholas refused, drew his pistol and threatened to shoot himself on the spot if the tsar did not endorse Witte's plan. This act was decisive in forcing Nicholas II to agree to the reforms.

From 1905 to the outbreak of World War I, he was commander of the Petersburg Military District. He had the reputation there of appointing men of humble origins to positions of authority. The lessons of the Russo-Japanese War were drilled into his men.

=== Marriage ===
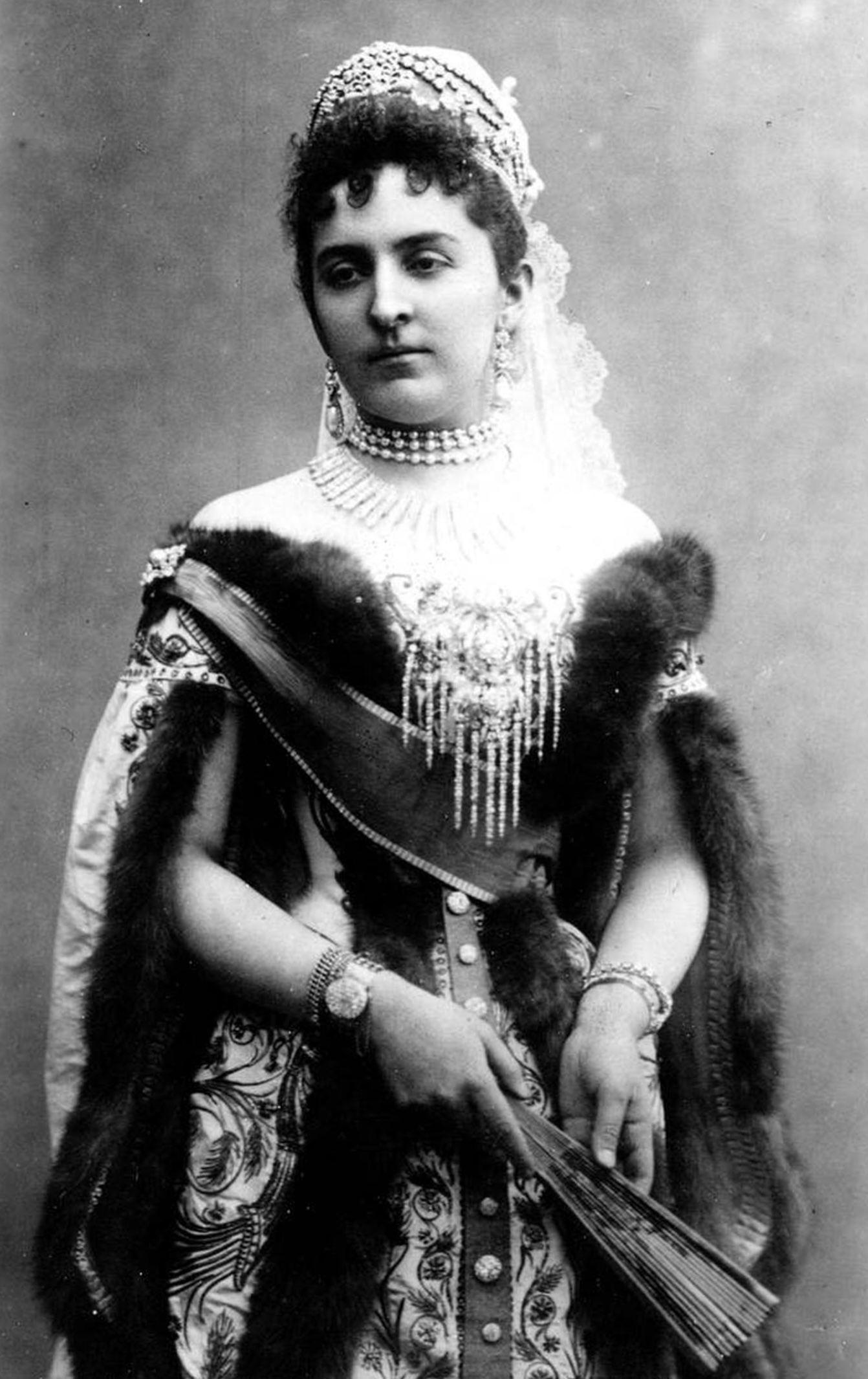
Anastasia of Montenegro

According to his cousin Gavriil, Nicholas lived with the actress Maria Alexandrovna Pototskaya for many years at Italianskaya Street 13, Saint Petersburg, which he purchased for her in 1896. Gavrill wrote in his memoirs that "she suffered a great deal after he later deserted her" in 1905.

On 29 April 1907, Nicholas married Princess Anastasia of Montenegro (1869–1935), the daughter of King Nicholas I, and sister of Princess Milica, who had married Nicholas's brother, Grand Duke Peter. They had no children. She had previously been married to George Maximilianovich, 6th Duke of Leuchtenberg, by whom she had two children, until their divorce in 1906. Since the Montenegrins were a fiercely Slavic, anti-Ottoman people from the Balkans, Anastasia reinforced the Pan-Slavic tendencies of Nicholas.

=== Hunting ===
Nicholas was a hunter. Ownership of borzoi hounds was restricted to members of the highest nobility, and Nicholas's packs were well known. After the revolution, the dogs in his kennel were sold off by the new Soviet government. In his lifetime, Nicholas and his dogs caught hundreds of wolves. A pair of borzoi were used, which caught the wolf, one on each side, while Nicholas dismounted and cut the wolf's throat with a knife. Hunting was his major recreation, and he travelled in his private train across Russia with his horses and dogs, hunting while on his rounds of inspection.

=== World War I ===
==== Eastern Front ====
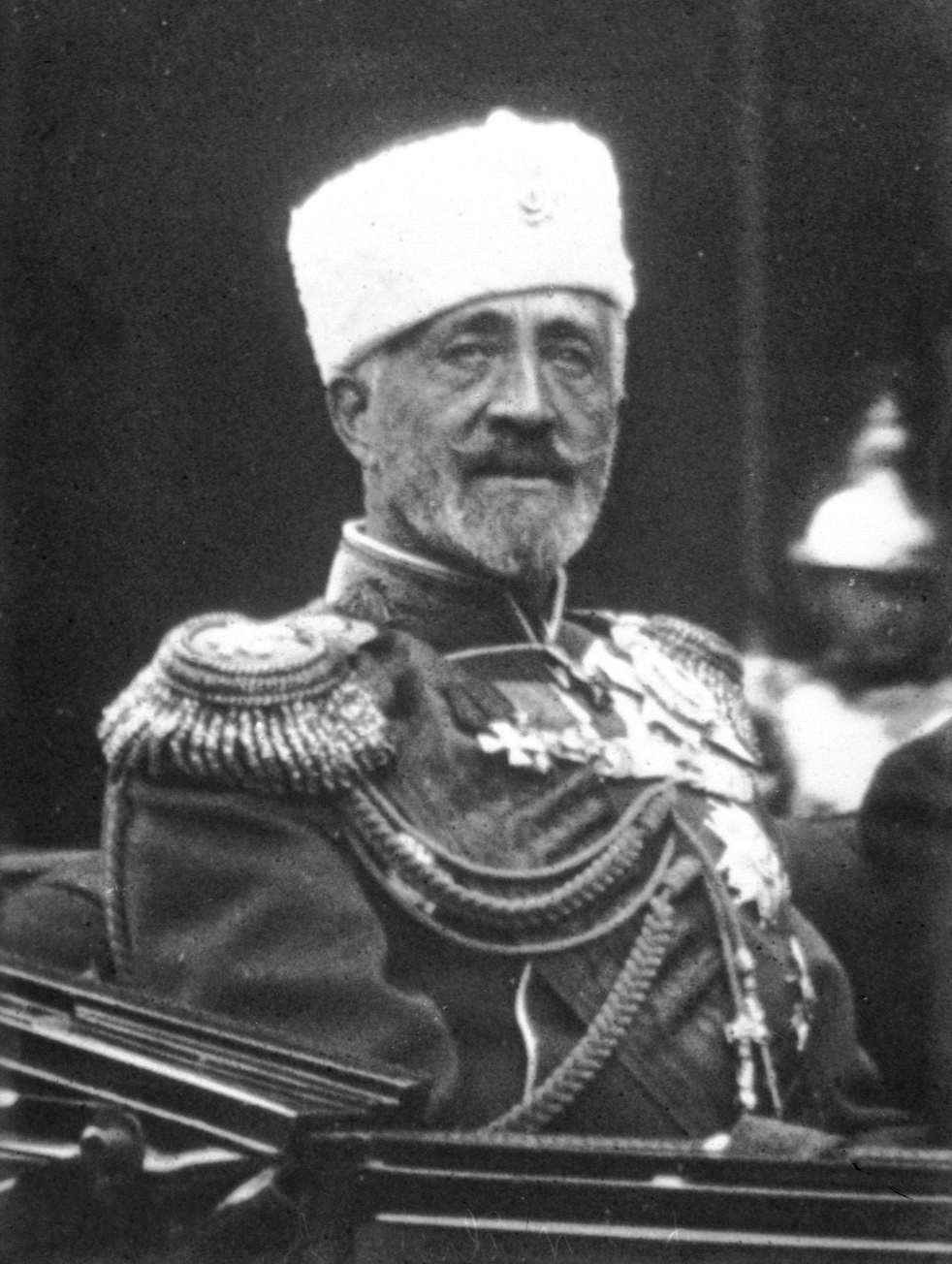
Grand Duke Nicholas in 1915

Grand Duke Nicholas had no part in the planning and preparations for World War I, that being the responsibility of General Vladimir Sukhomlinov and the general staff. On the eve of the outbreak of World War I, his first cousin once removed, Emperor Nicholas II, yielded to the entreaties of his ministers and appointed Grand Duke Nicholas to the supreme command. He was 57 years old and had never commanded armies in the field before, although he had spent almost all of his life on active service. His appointment was popular in the army. He was given responsibility for the largest army ever put into the field up to that date. He recalled that "... on receipt of the Imperial order, he spent much of his time crying because he did not know how to approach his new duties".

On 14 August 1914, he published the Manifesto to the Polish Nation.

Grand Duke Nicholas was responsible for all Russian forces fighting against Germany, Austria-Hungary, and the Ottoman Empire. He decided that their major effort must be in Poland, which thrust toward Germany like a salient, flanked by German East Prussia in the north, and Austro-Hungarian Galicia in the south. He planned to attend first to the flanks and when they were secure to invade German Silesia. In the north poor coordination of the two invading Russian armies resulted in the disaster of Tannenberg. In the south they conquered much of Galicia. Their subsequent move toward Silesia was blocked by the Battle of the Vistula River and Battle of Łódź. The grand duke picked and chose from the various plans offered by his generals. The grand duke begged for the artillery and ammunition they desperately lacked, so he could not embark on a coherent plan for victory. Nicholas came to power because of his royal status, and the tsar's belief that God was guiding his decision. He lacked the broad strategic sense and the ruthless drive to command all the Russian armies. His headquarters had a curiously calm atmosphere, despite the many defeats and the millions of casualties. He failed in terms of strategy and tactics, as well as logistics, selection of generals, maintaining morale, and gaining support from the government. On a personal level he was well liked by both officers and men.

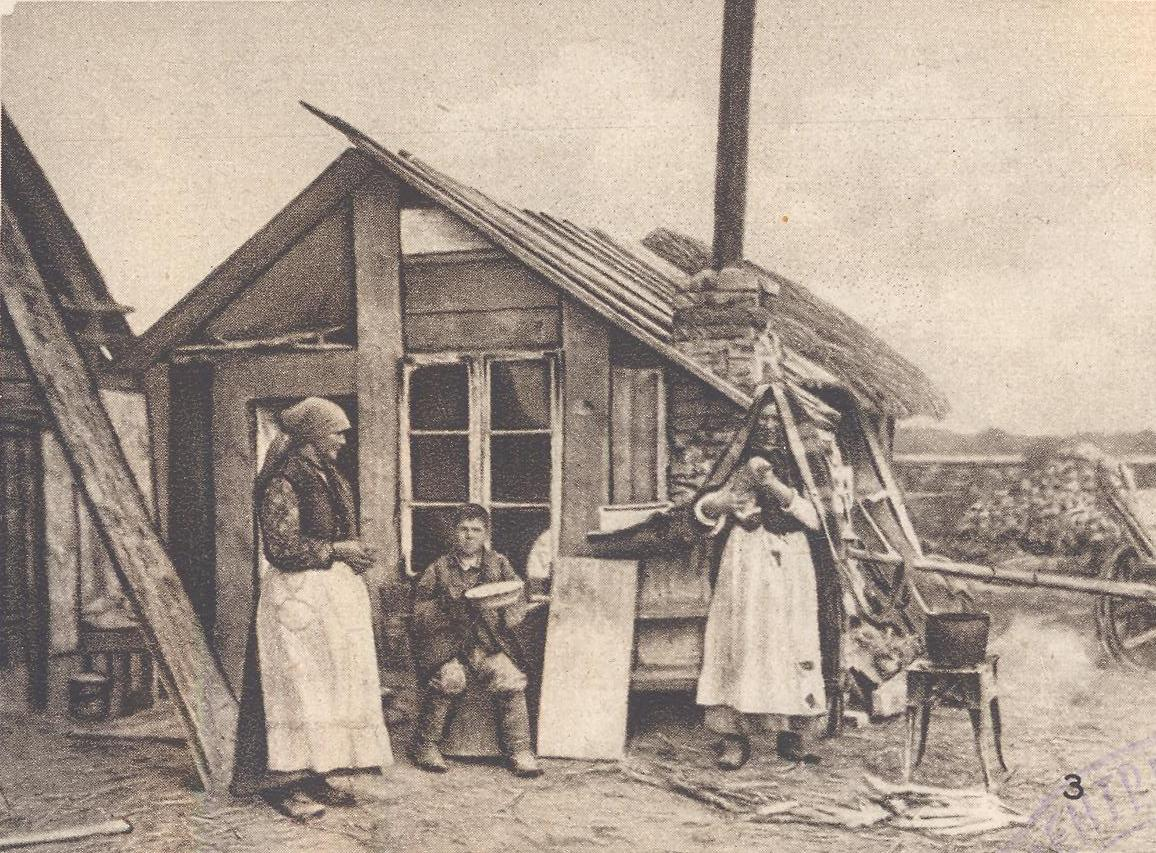
Peasants from a destroyed village in front of a shack constructed from debris, environs of Warsaw, 1915

After the Great Retreat of the Russian army, the Chief of the General Staff Nikolai Yanushkevich, with the full support of the Grand Duke Nicholas, ordered the army to devastate the border territories and expel the "enemy" nations within. The Russian authorities launched pogroms against German populations in Russian cities, massacred Jews in their towns and villages and deported 500,000 Jews and 250,000 Germans into the Russian interior. On 11 June 1915, a pogrom began against Germans in Petrograd, with over 500 factories, stores and offices looted and mob violence unleashed against Germans. The Russian military leadership regarded Muslims, Germans and Poles as traitors and spies, while Jews were considered politically unreliable.

As a result of his failure, the tsar removed the Grand Duke as commander of the Russian armed forces on 21 August 1915 and took personal command.

==== The Caucasus ====
Upon his dismissal, the grand duke was immediately appointed commander-in-chief and viceroy in the Caucasus (replacing Count Illarion Vorontsov-Dashkov). While the grand duke was officially in command, General Nikolai Nikolaevich Yudenich was the driving figure in the Russian Caucasus Army, so the grand duke focused on the civil administration. Their opponent was the Ottoman Empire. While the grand duke was in command, the Russian army sent an expeditionary force through to Persia to link up with British troops. Also in 1916, the Russian army captured the fortress town of Erzerum, the port of Trebizond and the town of Erzincan. The Turks responded with an offensive of their own. Fighting around Lake Van shifted repeatedly, but ultimately proved inconclusive.

It is reported that, while visiting the garrison of Kostroma he met Said Nursi, a famous Muslim cleric who was a prisoner of war. Because of Nursi's disrespectful attitude (he refused to greet the grand duke first, saying that the faithful were more senior than infidels), the grand duke gave an order to execute him. But after seeing Nursi's devotion to his religion during his last prayer, the grand duke changed his mind and amnestied Nursi. However, nothing in the Grand Duke's record suggests that he would have even considered such a war crime. At the time he was urging the tsar to set up colleges for training Muslim clerics so they would not have to study abroad.

Nicholas tried to have a railway built from Russian Georgia to the conquered territories with a view to bringing up more supplies for a new offensive in 1917. But, in March 1917, the tsar was overthrown and the Russian army began slowly to fall apart.

== Revolution ==
The February Revolution found Nicholas in the Caucasus. He was appointed by the emperor, in his last official act, as the supreme commander in chief, and was wildly received as he journeyed to headquarters in Mogilev; however, within 24 hours of his arrival, the new prime minister, Prince Georgy Lvov, cancelled his appointment. Nicholas spent the next two years in Crimea, sometimes under house arrest, taking little part in politics. There appears to have been some sentiment to have him head the White Army forces active in southern Russia at the time, but the leaders in charge, especially General Anton Denikin, were afraid that a strong monarchist figurehead would alienate the more left-leaning constituents of the movement. He and his wife escaped just ahead of the Red Army in April 1919, aboard the British Royal Navy battleship HMS Marlborough.

On 8 August 1922, Nicholas was proclaimed as the emperor of all the Russias by the Zemsky Sobor of the Priamurye region in the Far East which had been founded by Mikhail Diterikhs. Nicholas was already living abroad and consequently was not present. Two months later, the Priamurye region fell to the Bolsheviks.

== In exile ==
After a stay in Genoa as a guest of his brother-in-law, King Victor Emmanuel III of Italy, Nicholas and his wife took up residence in a small chateau at Choigny, 20 miles outside of Paris. He was under the protection of the French secret police as well as by a small number of loyal Cossack retainers.

He became the symbolic figurehead of an anti-Soviet Russian monarchist movement, after assuming on 16 November 1924 the supreme command of all Russian forces in exile and thus of the Russian All-Military Union, which had been founded in the Kingdom of Serbs, Croats and Slovenes by General Pyotr Wrangel two months prior. The monarchists made plans to send agents into Russia. Conversely, a top priority of the Soviet secret police was to penetrate this monarchist organization and to kidnap Nicholas. They were successful in the former, infiltrating the group with spies (OGPU later lured the anti-Bolshevik British master spy Sidney Reilly back to the Soviet Union (1925) where he was killed). They did not succeed however, in kidnapping Nicholas. As late as June 1927, the monarchists were able to set off a bomb at the Lubyanka Prison in Moscow.

Grand Duke Nicholas died on 5 January 1929 of natural causes on the French Riviera, where he had gone to escape the rigors of winter. He was originally buried in the church of St. Michael the Archangel Church in Cannes, France. In 2014 Prince Nicholas Romanov (1922–2014) and Prince Dimitri Romanov (1926–2016) requested the transfer of his remains. The bodies of Nicholas Nikolaevich and his wife were re-buried in Moscow at the World War I memorial military cemetery in May 2015.

== Legacy ==
Historian Richard Pipes said he was the most outstanding member of the Romanov dynasty in its final decades and the only member of the family to enjoy the respect and admiration of ordinary Russians.

== Honours and awards ==
The Grand Duke received several Russian and foreign decorations:

Russian

- Knight 4th Class of the Order of St. George – 1877
- Knight 3rd Class of the Order of St. George – 1914
- Knight 2nd Class of the Order of St. George – 1915
- Knight of the Order of St. Andrew the Apostle the First-called – 1856
- Knight of the Order of Saint Alexander Nevsky – 1856
- Knight 1st Class of the Order of St. Anna – 1856
- Knight 1st Class of the Order of St. Stanislaus – 1856
- Knight of the Imperial Order of the White Eagle – 1856
- Knight 1st Class of the Imperial Order of Saint Prince Vladimir – 1896

Foreign

- Knight of the Order of the Most Holy Annunciation (Kingdom of Italy) – 18 June 1890 – during a visit to Russia of King Victor Emmanuel III
- Knight of the Order of the Elephant (Denmark) – 19 July 1909
- Grand Cross of the Order of the Redeemer (Kingdom of Greece)
- Grand Cross of the Ludwig Order (Grand Duchy of Hesse and by Rhine) – 10 March 1886
- Grand Cross of the House Order of the Wendish Crown (Mecklenburg)
- Grand Cross of the Order of Danilo I (Principality of Montenegro)
- Grand Cross of the House and Merit Order of Peter Frederick Louis, with Golden Crown (Grand Duchy of Oldenburg) – 7 December 1856
- Knight of the Order of the Black Eagle (Kingdom of Prussia) – 23 March 1877
- Pour le Mérite (military) (Kingdom of Prussia) – 22 March 1879
- Grand Cross of the Order of the Cross of Takovo (Kingdom of Serbia)
- Grand Cross of the Order of the Star of Romania (Kingdom of Romania)
- Grand Cross of the Royal Hungarian Order of St. Stephen (Austria-Hungary) – 1896
- Grand Cross of the Legion d'Honneur (France) – January 1897
- Grand Cross of the Order of the Württemberg Crown (Kingdom of Württemberg) – 1882

== In popular culture ==
Grand Duke Nicholas was portrayed in the 1971 film Nicholas and Alexandra by Harry Andrews, and in the 1974 television drama Fall of Eagles by John Phillips.

== Sources ==
- Baberowski, Jörg; Doering-Manteuffel, Anselm (2009). Geyer, Michael; Fitzpatrick, Sheila (eds.). Beyond Totalitarianism: Stalinism and Nazism compared. Cambridge University Press. ISBN 978-0-521-89796-9.
- Dowling, Timothy C. (2014). Russia at War: From the Mongol Conquest to Afghanistan, Chechnya, and Beyond [2 volumes]. ABC-CLIO. ISBN 978-1-59884-948-6.
- Robinson, Paul. "A Study of Grand Duke Nikolai Nikolaevich as Supreme Commander of the Russian Army, 1914–1915." Historian 75.3 (2013): 475–498. JSTOR 24456116
- Fromkin, David. A Peace To End All Peace Avon Books, New York, 1990
- McMeekin, Sean (2017). The Russian Revolution: A New History. London: Basic Books. ISBN 978-0-46503-990-6.
- John Curtis Perry and Constantine Pleshakov. The Flight of the Romanovs, A Family Saga Basic Books, New York, 1999
- "Encyclopædia Britannica", Vol. 16, pp. 420–421, Chicago, 1958
- Figes, Orlando. A People's Tragedy, The Russian Revolution 1891–1924, Pimlico, London, 1997
