= Manifesto to the Polish Nation =

The Manifesto to the Polish Nation, also called the Manifesto of Grand Duke Nicholas or Manifesto of the 14th August 1914 (Polish: Odezwa Wielkiego Księcia Mikołaja Mikołajewicza) was a proclamation by Grand Duke Nicholas, commander in chief of the Russian armies to Poles on 14 August 1914 after the outbreak of World War I. Nicholas, proclaiming that though 'a hundred and fifty years ago the living body of Poland was torn to pieces, [...] her soul survived and she lived in hope that for the Polish people would come an hour of regeneration and reconciliation with Russia'. Nicholas promised the re-unification of the Polish lands under the aegis of the Russian tsar and an autonomy to the Poles. The manifesto was met with appreciation by Roman Dmowski, one of the leaders of the Polish nationalists.
