= Memorial park complex of the heroes of the First World War =

Park in Moscow

Coordinates: 55°47′59″N 37°30′45.2″E

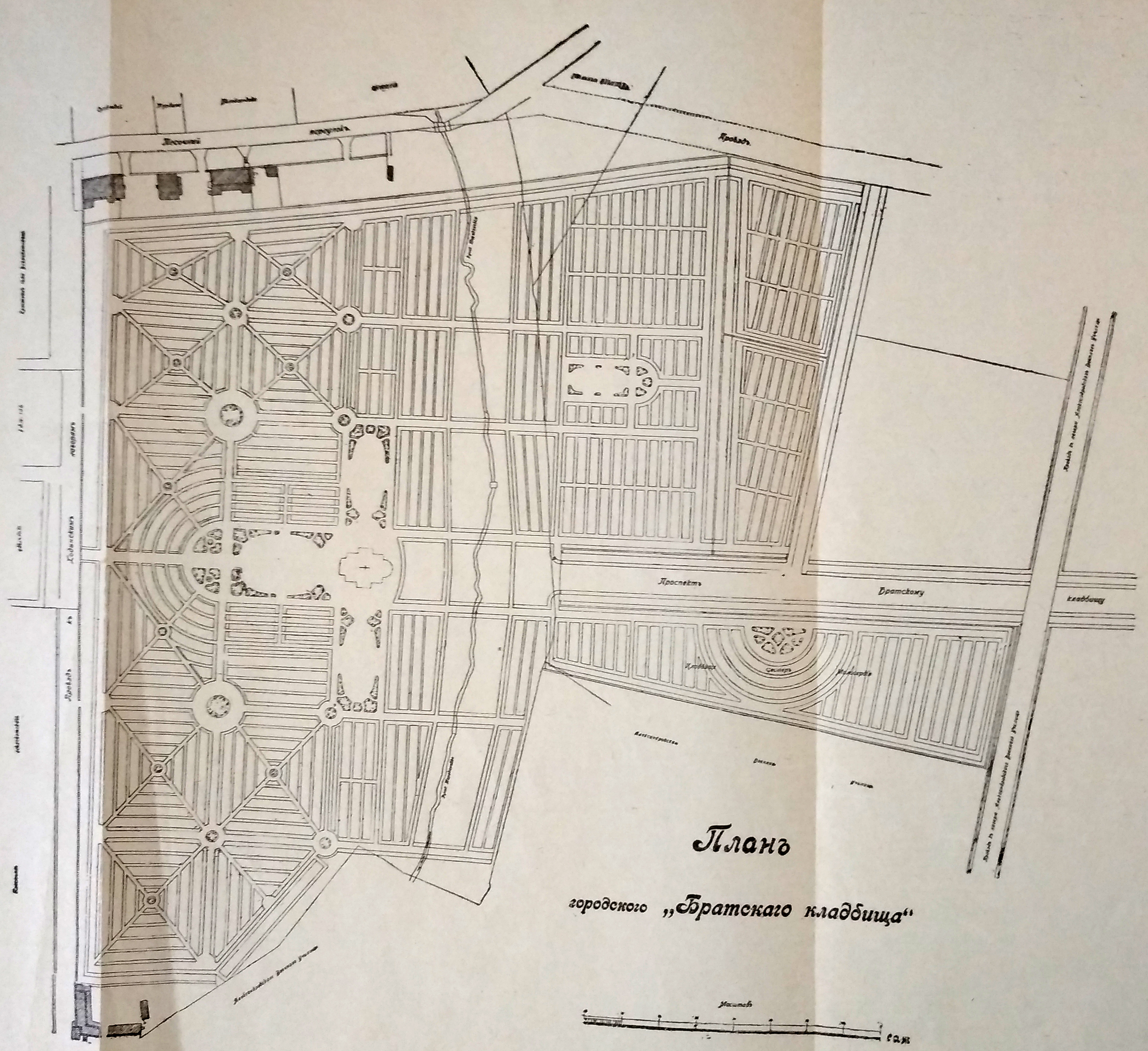
The cemetery map in 1915

Memorial park complex of the heroes of the First World War (Russian: Мемориально-парковый комплекс героев Первой мировой войны) is a park in Moscow, Russia. It is located in the Sokol District of the Northern Administrative Okrug. The area of the park is 11.2 hectares.

== History ==
Earlier there was the Moscow City Bratsky (Fraternal) Cemetery on the place of the park. The cemetery was founded in 1915 by the Grand Duchess Elizabeth Feodorovna. Almost 18,000 victims of the World War I were buried in the cemetery. In 1918 the Church of the Transfiguration was built here by architect Alexey Shchusev.

In 1925 the Fraternal Cemetery was closed for burials. In 1932 it was turned into a park. All the tombstones, with the exception of one, were demolished. In the late 1940s the Church of the Transfiguration was demolished too.

During perestroika many public figures spoke out for the revival of the memorial in the park, set on the site of the Moscow City Fraternal Cemetery. The Chapel of the Transfiguration was built there in 1998. In 2004 the park got the name "Memorial park complex of the heroes of the First World War" and some monuments were erected there.

== Gallery ==
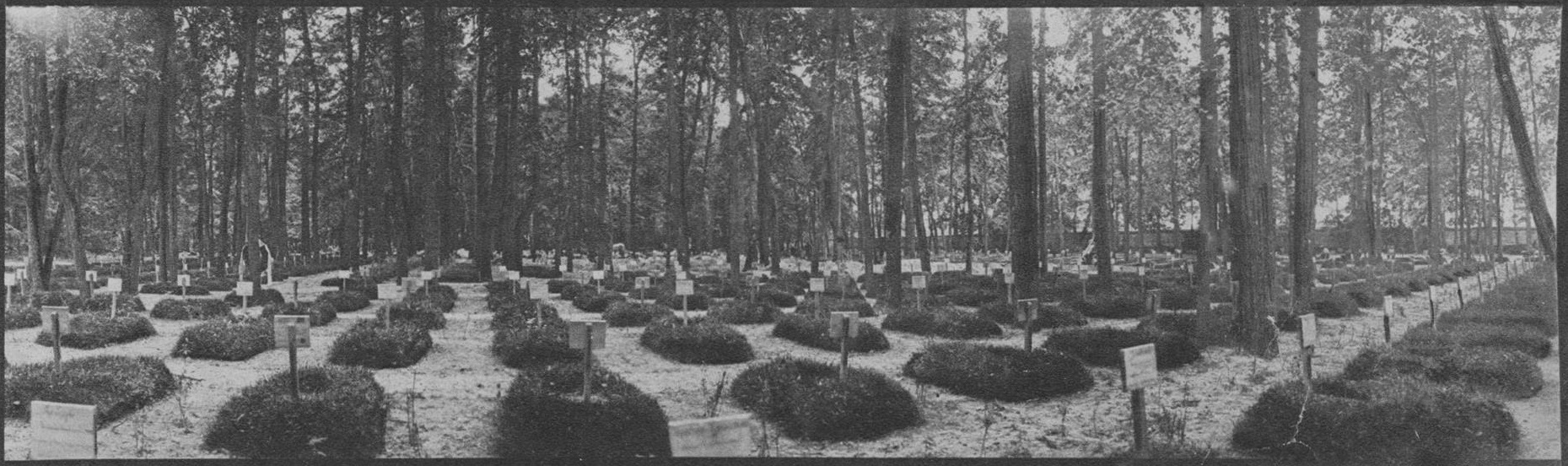
The graves in 1915

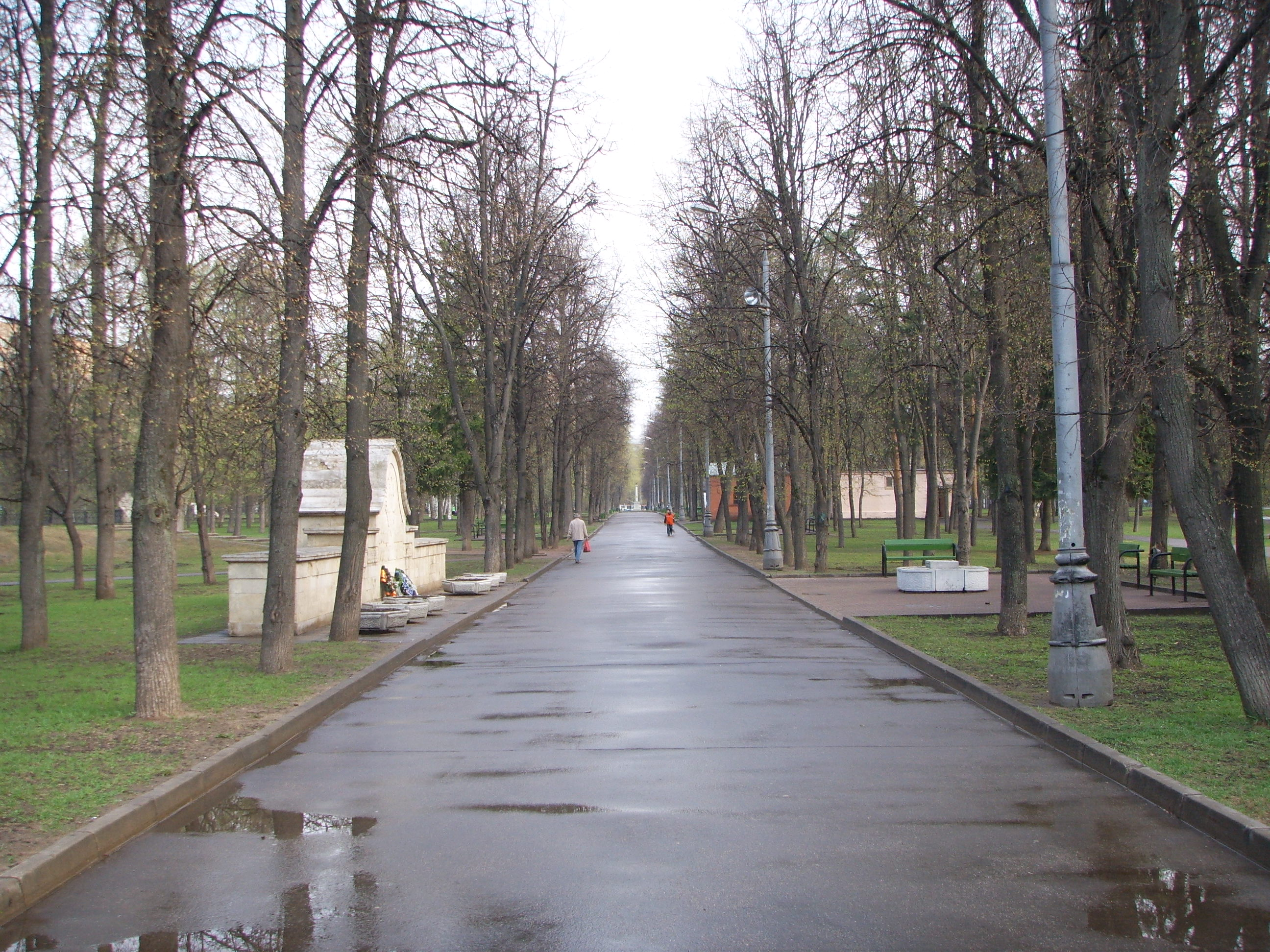
Main alley of the Memorial park in 2010

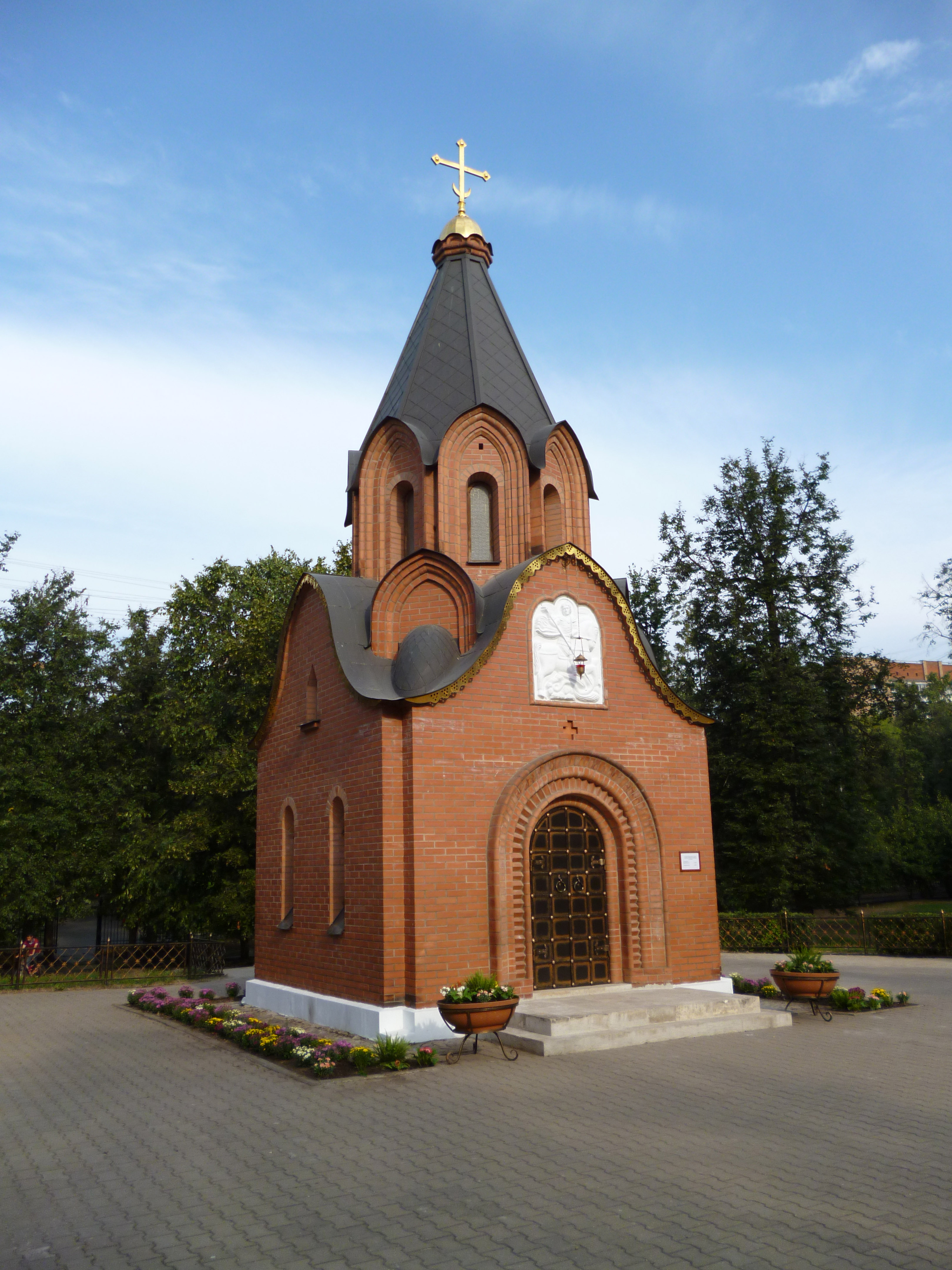
The Transfiguration Chapel

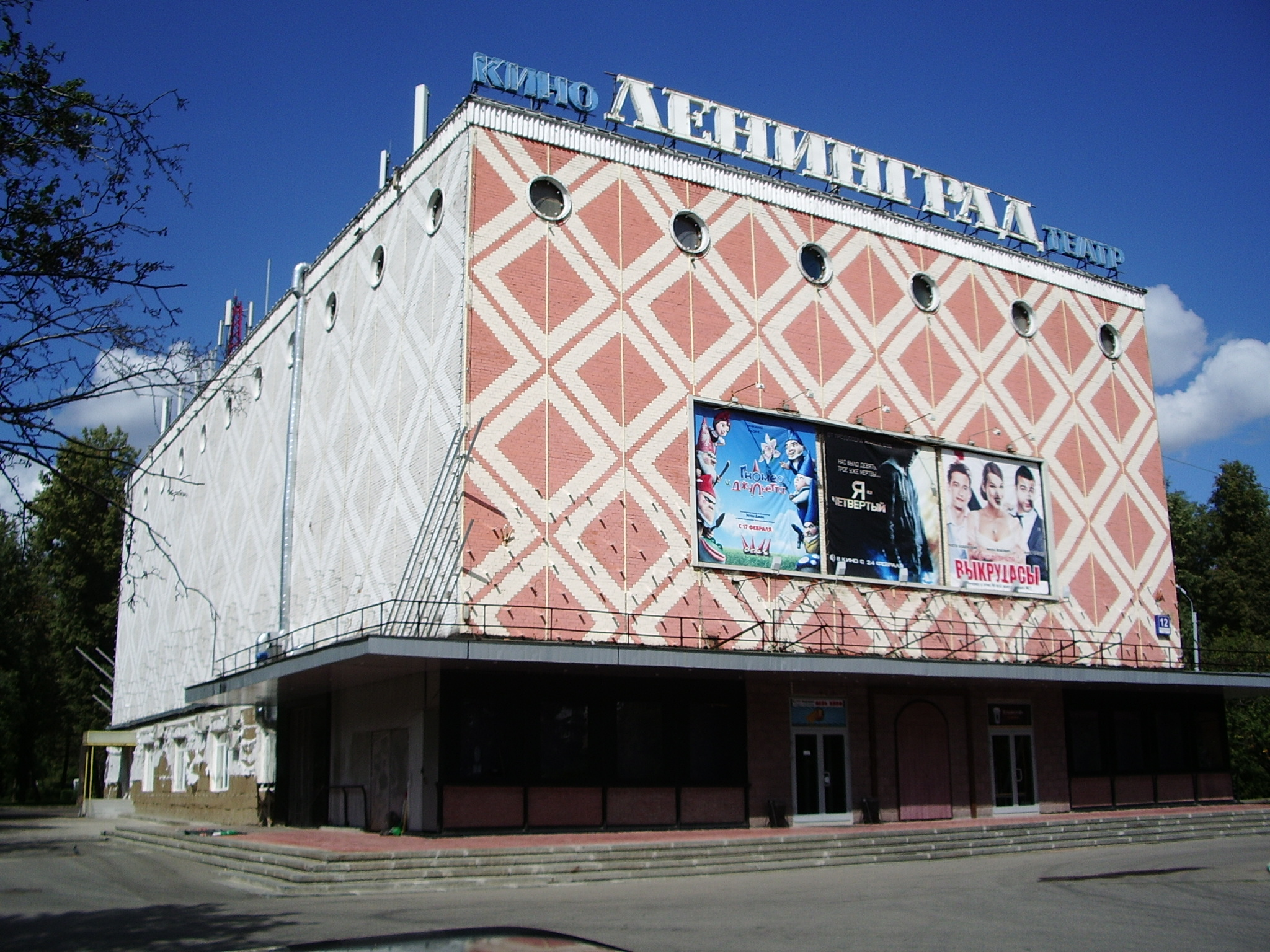
The "Leningrad Cinema"

== Bibliography ==
- Petrone, Karen (2011). The Great War in Russian Memory. Indiana University Press. ISBN 978-0-253-35617-8.
