= Battle of Vilnius (1915) =

1915 strategic Russian withdrawal on the Eastern Front of World War I

- Part of the Eastern Front of World War I
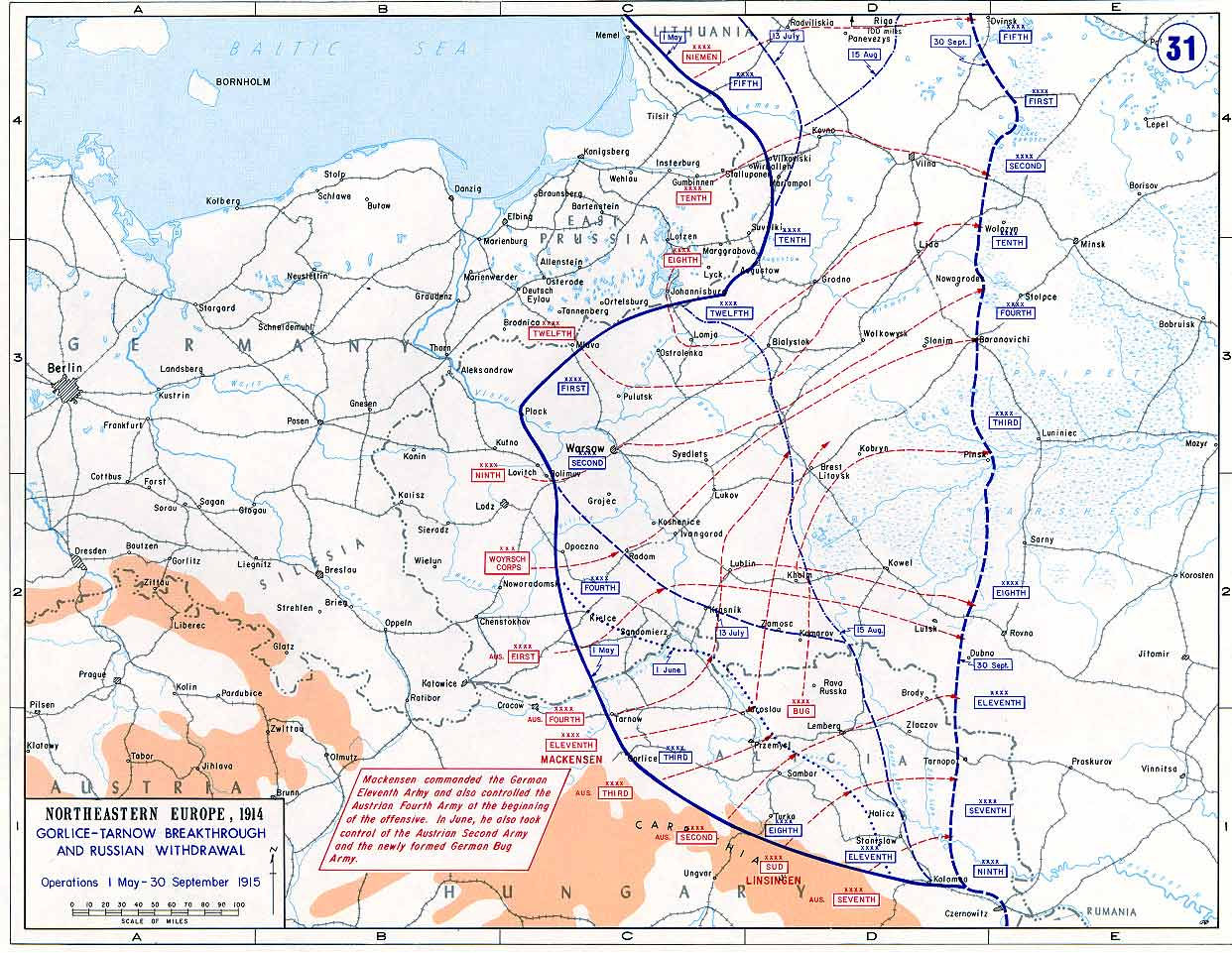
- Russian withdrawal in 1915.
Date	29 August – 30 November 1915
Location	Lithuania and Belarus
Result	Russian victory Full results: German plan to encircle the Russian 10th Army failed; German offensive on Dvinsk completely failed
Territorial changes	Germans capture Vilnius; End of Great retreat

Belligerents
German Empire	Russian Empire

Commanders and leaders
(German Empire) Paul von Hindenberg; (German Empire) Erich Ludendorff	Nicholas II (Note: Supreme Commander–in–Chief); Mikhail Alekseyev; Nikolai Ruzsky

Units involved
(German Empire) Army of the Niemen; (German Empire) 10th Army; (German Empire) 12th Army; (German Empire) 8th Army; (German Empire) 9th Army	5th Army; 10th Army; 1st Army; 12th Army; 2nd Army

Strength
948,048	On all front: 1,911,157

Casualties and losses
116,187 (Note: 33,337 (KIA); 10,715 (MIA); 72,135 (WIA))	80,000 (Note: The losses of the Russian army range from 12,340 (2nd Army) to 30,000 (10th Army) as a result, the total losses should be from 80,000 to 100,000) to 376,574 (Note: 53,173 (KIA); 126,025 (MIA); 197,376 (WIA))

The Battle of Vilnius (German: Schlacht bei Wilna) or the Vilnius operation (Russian: Виленская операция) took place in the autumn of 1915 between the cities of Vilnius and Daugavpils. It was strategic withdrawal by Russian forces on the Eastern Front of World War I, after a successful summer German offensive. The German armies were under the command of Supreme Commander of All German Forces in the East, Field Marshal Paul von Hindenburg. Although weakened by the transfer of 12 divisions to France and the Balkans, as part of taking a defense, Hindenburg had his forces conduct several secondary offensive operations. Half of the Russian forces and the main German forces on the Eastern Front took part in the battle. However, the numerical superiority of the Russians did not allow Hindenburg to achieve a lasting success. Further actions for the Germans were unsuccessful as they suffered losses without achieving their goal of taking Daugavpils.

== Background ==
The limited success of the Hindenburg's Army Group after the sieges of Kaunas and Novogeorgievsk forced the Chief of German Great General Staff, General of Infantry Erich von Falkenhayn, to make the final decision to curtail operations in the German Eastern front, especially since large regroupings of troops were necessary for the offensive against Serbia and strengthening the defense in France and Belgium. On August 27–28, 1915, Emperor Wilhelm II, at the insistence of Falkenhayn, issued a directive on the urgent construction of long-term defensive zones on the Eastern Front from the Baltic Sea in the area north of Mitava to the Narew river further to Kovel. At the same time, the army groups of Prince Leopold of Bavaria and August von Mackensen should continue the offensive solely with the aim of occupying positions more convenient for defense (bypassing from the north of Białowieża Forest), and the army group of Hindenburg - for "causing a major defeat to the enemy".

Significant changes have taken place in the management of the Russian army in the field. As early as August 17, the chief of staff of the Supreme Commander Nikolai Yanushkevich issued a decision on the division of the armies of the Northwestern Front despite the objections of the Commander-in-Chief Mikhail Alekseyev. On the night of August 31, the directorates of the Northern Front were formed; General of Infantry Nikolai Ruzsky was appointed commander-in-chief, Major General M. Bonch-Bruyevich was appointed his chief of staff; the front included the 6th, 5th and 12th Armies - the management of the latter was transformed from the apparatus of the 13th Army. The task of the armies of the Northern Front was to cover the routes to Petrograd, including from the Baltic coast. The task of the armies of the Western Front (Commander-in-Chief Infantry General Alekseyev, Chief of Staff Lieutenant General Arseny Gulevich) was the defense of the Vilnius, Grodno-Bialystok and Brest-Pinsk regions. The position of the armies of the Eastern Front was complicated by the fact that the Germans stood on the outskirts of Vilnius and had already captured Brest-Litovsk.

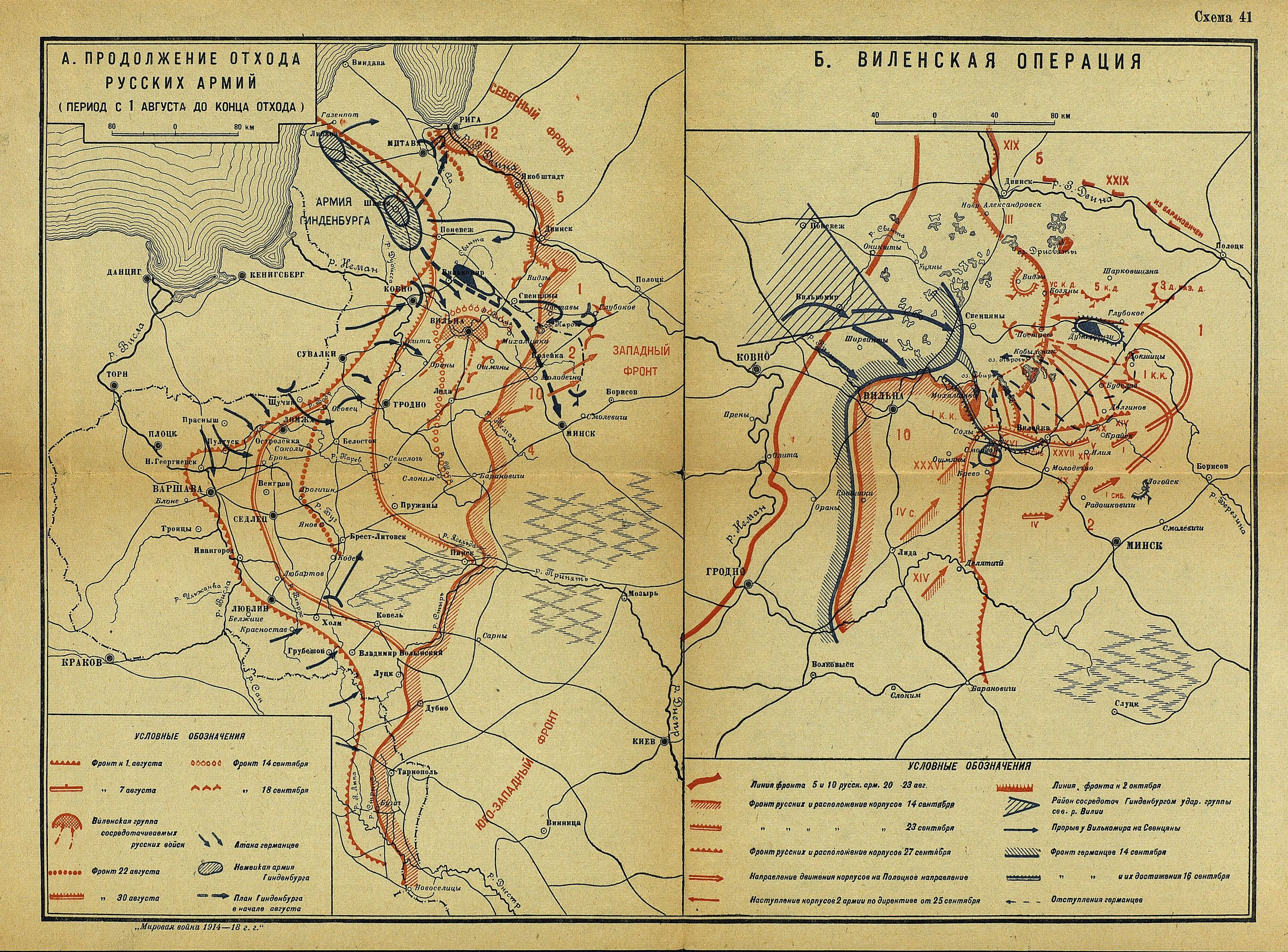
Russian map detailing the movements of the battle

== Second offensive on Vilnius ==
On September 1, the German 8th and 12th Armies (335,696 men) launched an offensive on Grodno and Slonim. Parts of the 8th Army managed to overcome the swampy floodplain of the Bobr River in a day and approach the forts of Grodno. The German 12th Army crossed the Svislach River. The Germans were opposed by the 1st Army of Cavalry General Alexander Litvinov (270,504 men) in Grodno and the 2nd Army of Infantry General V. Smirnov (247,176 men) in the Lida directions. Already in the afternoon of September 1, the Grodno garrison began to fire from heavy guns; the paucity of heavy artillery of the German 8th Army made it necessary to concentrate fire only on forts I, III and IV; attacks on the forts of the 1st and 11th Landwehr Divisions were repulsed by the garrison. The next day, the Germans managed to capture the intermediate trenches between the forts and cross the Neman River, from the north, parts of the III Reserve Corps of the German 10th Army, advancing from Druskininkai, cut all roads to Vilnius, and the garrison began to leave the forts under the threat of encirclement. On September 3, German troops broke into the fortress, parts of the 20th Army Corps and the garrison retreated. Germans captured 3,600 prisoners and 6 heavy guns.

A new transition to the offensive of the armies of the Central Powers, the abandonment of Grodno, the German's exit to the Western Dvina and Lutsk forced Emperor Nicholas II to decide to assume the supreme command. This was announced on September 5. Infantry General Alekseyev was appointed the new Chief of Staff of the Supreme Commander, and Lieutenant General Mikhail Pustovoitenko was appointed Quartermaster General of the Headquarters.

Hindenburg struck the main blow in the direction of Dvinsk, Vilnius, for which a redeployment of the Army of the Niemen and 10th Army was carried out with the concentration of almost the entire cavalry at the junction of these armies. In the ranks they numbered 502,357 men. In the Riga direction, the Russian 12th Army of the Northern Front (commander Infantry General V. Gorbatovsky, 185,989 men) defended, in the Dvina direction - the Russian 5th Army (commander general of cavalry Paul von Plehwe, 135,638 men). In the most difficult Vilnius-Minsk direction were the positions of the 10th Army of General of Infantry E. Radkevich (300,147 men).

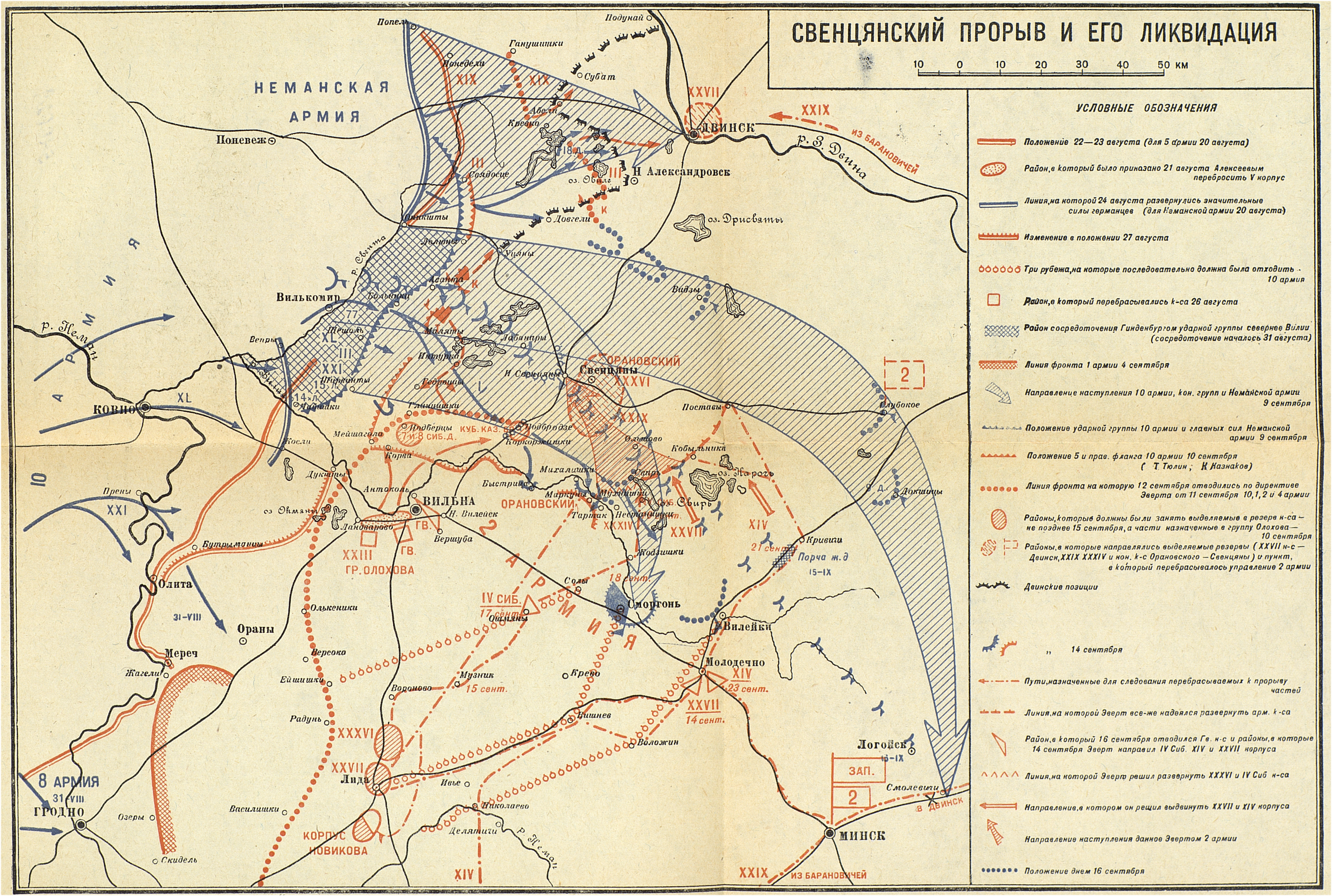
Map depicting Švenčionys breakthrough (August 22 to September 16)

== German Švenčionys breakthrough ==
Russian troops outnumbered the Germans in manpower; in addition, as at Gorlice–Tarnów offensive, the German struck at the most powerful Russian army. At the same time, the strike zone of the German 10th Army was chosen in such a way that in front of the strike group there was mainly Russian cavalry. The section of the front from Ukmergė to Wuqiang became such a place, the German I and XXI Corps were transferred here. On September 9, Russian positions were broken through at Širvintos to a depth of 20 km. The cavalry detachment of Lieutenant General N. Kaznakov was withdrawn by order of Plehve, the commander of the 5th Army, exposing the flank of the 10th Army, and on September 10 was driven back in battle with the German cavalry and Beckman's division and retreated behind Utena. The cavalry detachment of Lieutenant General Mikael Thylin was thrown back 10 km from the Širvinta River.

A 60-km gap formed between the flanks of the Russian 5th and 10th Armies, into which the German divisions rushed. On September 12, the German cavalry occupied Švenčionėliai (Novo-Sventiany), and the infantry of the I and XXI Corps went to Maišiagala and Pabradė. The 3rd Siberian Army Corps and the 2nd Finnish Rifle Division were transferred to the right flank of the 10th Army to help. On the left flank of the 10th Army, the 2nd and 26th Army Corps were withdrawn to Leipalingis.

As early as September 11, Alekseyev issued a directive on the transfer to the Švenčionys Offensive of the 2nd Army, which included corps withdrawn to the reserve from the 1st, 4th and 3rd Armies (14th, 27th, 29th, 36th and 4th Siberian Army Corps). But the concentration of troops was slowed down both by the condition of the roads as a result of the rains that had begun, and by the actions of the Germans on communications. The C-in-C of the Western Front armies, General of Infantry Aleksei Evert, ordered the 10th Army to concentrate a strong grouping on the right flank and go on the offensive north-west of Vilnius, and cover the gap with the armies of the Northern Front with the cavalry corps of the general from cavalry Vladimir Oranovsky.

The right flank of the Army of the Niemen broke through to the Utena, creating a threat to Dvinsk. By September 14, the German 1st and XXXIX Reserve Corps pushed back the left wing of the Russian 5th Army to Dvinsk and captured a bridgehead along a 60-km arc from Lake Salava to Ilūkste: the strike group of the German 10th Army advanced to Vileyka and Molodechno, letting in the breakthrough, the cavalry corps of Manfred von Richthofen and O. von Garnier; Švenčionys and Narach were captured, but on the outskirts of Vilnius the Germans was repulsed by the forces of the Guards, 3rd Siberian and 5th Caucasian Corps.

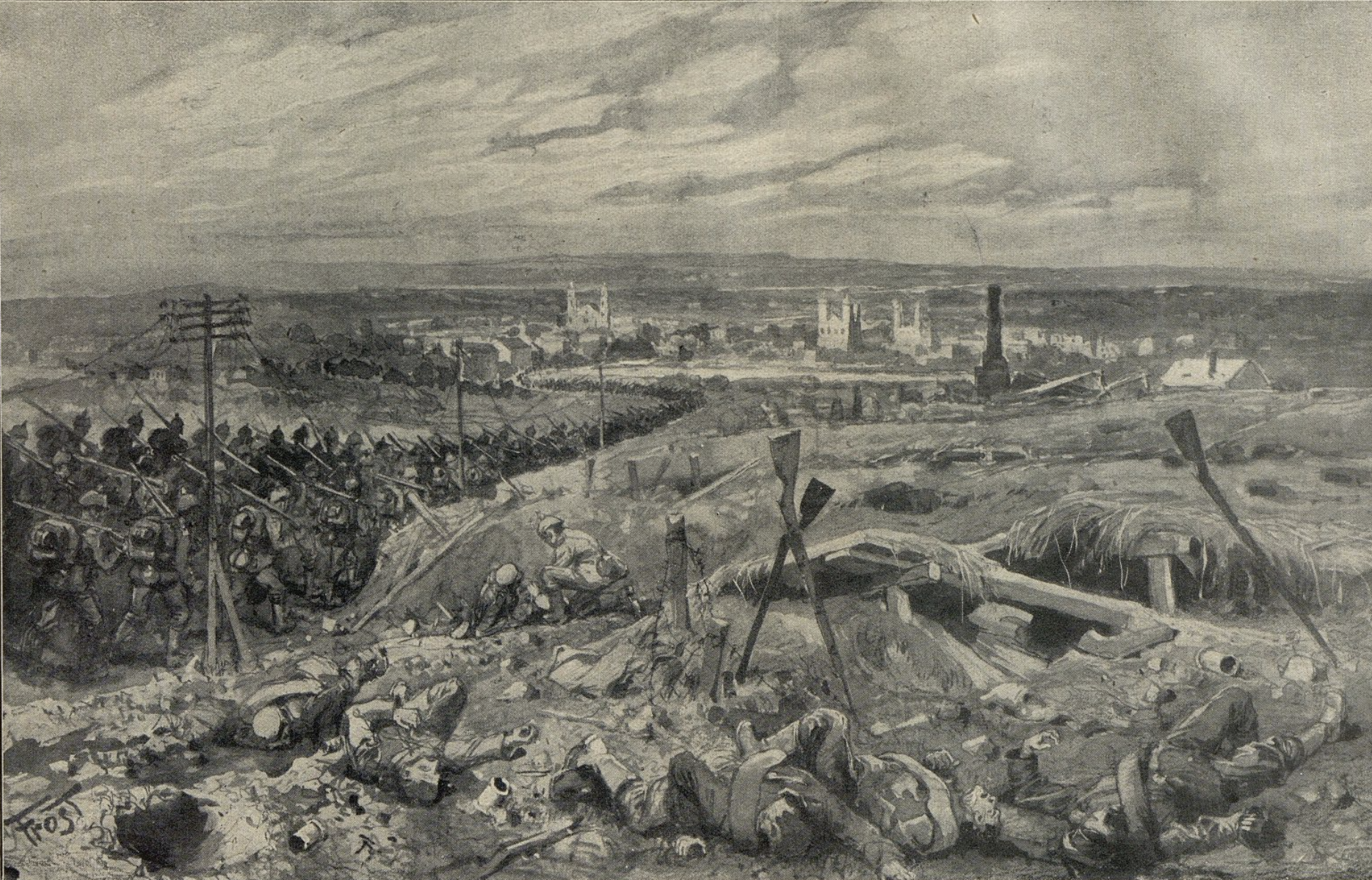
German drawing depicting the entry of German troops into Vilnius

Only on September 15, Oranovsky's cavalry corps appeared on the path of the German cavalry near the Sola and Smarhon, but the next day the Russian troops had to leave Vilnius under the threat of encirclement. By September 15, the German 12th, 8th and 9th Armies crossed the Neman River and occupied the entire western bank of the Shchara River. Army Group Mackensen (11th and Bug Armies, total 263,812 men) broke through the positions of the Russian 3rd Army.

On September 16, the German group of Johannes von Eben threw back Oranovsky's cavalry, but the onslaught of the Germans was stopped by the arriving units of the 2nd Army Corps. On the Ashmyanka River, the German cavalry division was stopped by the approaching regiments of the 5th Army Corps. The remaining divisions of the cavalry corps of Garnier and Richthofen occupied Zhuprany, Baruny, Vileyka and Smarhon with a front to the west and southeast, dedicating a squadron to undermine the Minsk-Smolensk railway (this was only possible on September 20).

On September 17, the German 3rd Cavalry Division reached the approaches to Molodechno, but 3-4 km from the city was stopped by the arriving units of the Russian 27th Army Corps. The German 1st and 4th Cavalry Divisions were met by the regiments of the 36th Army Corps that arrived in Ashmyany.

On September 17, the Supreme Commander Nicholas II (and in fact Alekseyev) issued a directive on the withdrawal from the night of September 18 over the next three nights of the Western Front's armies to the line of Mikhalishki, Ashmyany, Novogrudok, Baranovichi, Vyhanaščanskaje Lake, and the 2nd Army was given an order to capture Švenčionys and Mikhalishki, reestablish contact with the 5th Army of the Northern Front and push back the Germans from Vileyka and Smarhon to Lida and Vilnius. To counteract the enemy cavalry and reach the rear of his grouping on the right flank of the 2nd Army, under the command of Oranovsky, the detachments of Kaznakov, princes K. Toumanov and S. Belosselsky-Belozersky (up to 8 divisions) joined. Under their cover, the 1st Army, also deployed to the north, was gathering in the Polotsk direction.

The maneuver of the Russian troops was facilitated by the mass withdrawal of German troops to the reserve to be sent to France - to repel the French offensive in Champagne and Artois - and against Serbia. The German High Command considered the operation against the Russian army completed, and by the end of September, 23 divisions left Russia, including 11 from the army group of August von Mackensen and 12 from the army group of Hindenburg. The remaining troops from September 20 ceased offensive operations and were withdrawn to the newly created fortified lines. On September 19-20, the Russian 2nd Army and the group of Infantry General Vasily Flug (Guards, 3rd Siberian, 2nd and 5th Army Corps) went on the offensive in order to drive the Germans out of the Ashmyanka and Neris rivers. The 27th, 36th and 4th Siberian Army Corps ousted Garnier's cavalry from Smarhon, but the offensive of Flug's corps was repulsed, the Eben group struck at the 3rd Siberian and 2nd Army Corps. Behind the second echelon cavalry were the German I and XXI Corps.

The Russian 10th Army retreated to Molodechno. On September 23, the Russian Headquarters issued a directive to attack the rear of the Germans from the town of Narach with the forces of the cavalry of the Russian 2nd Army; the Russian 5th Army was entrusted with covering the paths to Polotsk. From the German side, X. von Eichhorn ordered the pursuit of Radkevich's retreating army.

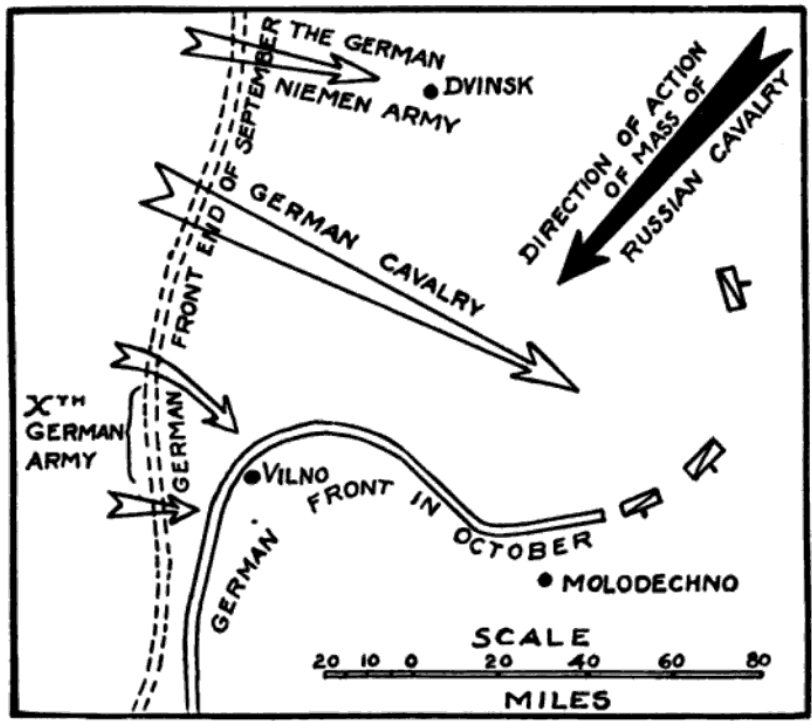
Russian thwarting of German offensive near Vilnius, September 1915, WWI

On the left flank of the Russian 5th Army, Kaznakov's cavalry corps went on the offensive on September 17-19 and threw back the German cavalry. The hastily transferred German 2nd Cavalry Division forced Kaznakov to retreat again to Polotsk, on September 26 the gap between the Neman River and the German 10th Army was closed by the 8th Cavalry and 3rd Infantry Divisions. On September 24-26, the German 10th Army was able to advance with its right wing to the Berezina River, Smarhon. After fortifying the front, the 10th Army went on the defensive, completing the enveloping offensive. The Russian armies avoided encirclement and themselves created a threat of breaking through German positions.

On September 27, Hindenburg stated that the offensive operation was completed and the armies should take a long-term "winter" position from the mouth of the Berezina River to Lake Narach, west of Dinaburg and east of Mitava. However, the Russian side did not consider the battles over. Alekseyev was preparing to launch a counterattack and throw the Germans back to his original position. To do this, on September 28, the cavalry group of Oranovsky received the task of breaking through to the rear of the Germans in the direction of Sventiany and pushing the enemy back beyond Panevėžys and Ukmergė.

On the evening of September 27, the left wing of the German 10th Army began to retreat on a fortified position, the cavalry of Garnier and Richthofen covered the retreat. The transition to the offensive of the cavalry group of Oranovsky dragged on until the evening of September 28, but at that time the German cavalry was already on its way. Oranovsky was forced to throw two divisions into the attack on Dunilavichy, but their maneuver was unsuccessful. Cavalry attacks on 30 September were also repulsed. After the arrival of the Russian 1st Siberian and 1st Army Corps, attacks on Pastavy resumed and ended with the liberation of the city.

== Battle in October ==
In an effort to prevent the Germans from breaking through to Polotsk, Aleksei Evert proposed to Russian Supreme Commander to transfer the reserve corps of the Russian Western Front and the command of the 1st Army to this direction. On September 25, the corresponding directive was given by Alekseyev, the first corps entered the battle at the end of September. On October 2, the headquarters of the 1st Army arrived in Seslavino; preparations began for a new offensive on Tverečius and Komai by the forces of the 1st Siberian, 1st and 4th Army Corps. But by this time, to the north of Lake Narach, to the Dvinsk-Jakobstadt road, an army group of artillery general F. von Scholz from the cavalry corps of Richthofen and three infantry divisions was deployed. The attacks of the Russian 1st Army on October 4-6 were met by the stubborn defense of these troops and completely repulsed. On October 7, A. Evert, by his order, stopped the aimless attacks, which cost great sacrifices. From October 10, the 10th and 2nd Armies also stopped attacking and went on the defensive. The German 10th Army also stopped attacks on Smorgon'.

The Russian 1st Army also went on the defensive between the Myadzyel and lake Drūkšiai, but with the task of assisting the neighboring 5th Army in the defense of Dvinsk. During September, the German Army of the Niemen was advancing on Dvinsk and Jakobstadt, slowly moving forward. On September 28, the Army of the Niemen was transformed into the 8th Army, and parts of its right wing formed the army group of Scholz. On October 6-10, the positions of the 5th Army near Sivishki were broken through. The Russian 1st Army, having received the cavalry group of Oranovsky and the 6th Siberian Army Corps, on October 11 struck at the flank of the Germans near the lakes Drūkšiai and Demmern and captured part of the trenches. Further advance was stopped, the repetition of attacks until October 19 did not lead to success, however, the attack on Ilūkste was also repelled by the 5th Army.

Only on October 23 did the Germans resume their offensive against Dvinsk. Heavy artillery fire was corrected from the air by pilots. Many hours of artillery shelling led to the demoralization of the defenders of the position. By evening, the Germans occupied Ilūkste. But the resumption of attacks on October 26-27 did not bring the Germans the previous successes. Russian troops skillfully defended themselves and launched counterattacks. Only in the battles of November 2–3, Russian troops on the Dvina bridgehead were driven out of the lake defile, but defended Dvinsk. The German troops failed to achieve the main goal of the offensive to the Western Dvina River.

== Outcome ==
The Second offensive on Vilnius and the Švenčionys breakthrough ended with the advance of the army groups of Hindenburg, Prince Leopold of Bavaria, and Mackensen to the line as a whole outlined by the German Supreme High Command, on which it was necessary to keep the defense in the future. At the same time, it was not possible to defeat the opposing Russian troops, as Falkenhayn and Hindenburg hoped. This was facilitated by the timely transfer of Russian troops, and the most massive outflow of German formations to other theaters. This was a completely unusual event in military history, when, instead of developing a breakthrough, dozens of divisions were withdrawn from the advancing armies. Despite the capture by the Germans of 95,885 prisoners (of which 421 were officers), 37 guns, 298 machine guns, an aircraft, the loss of Vilnius and Baranovichi, Russian troops retained their combat capability. After stubborn fighting on September 24–26, German troops retreated to the "winter line of defense" west of Dvinsk. By October 9, the Germans entrenched themselves in this position and during October repulsed the attempts of the Russian side to knock them down from the occupied fortified line. The parties' attempts to achieve a turning point in certain sectors of the front before the end of November only led to unjustified losses. The Germans' plan to take Dvinsk failed. No matter what it would cost, Russia defended Dvinsk.
