= Imperial Russian Army formations and units (1914) =

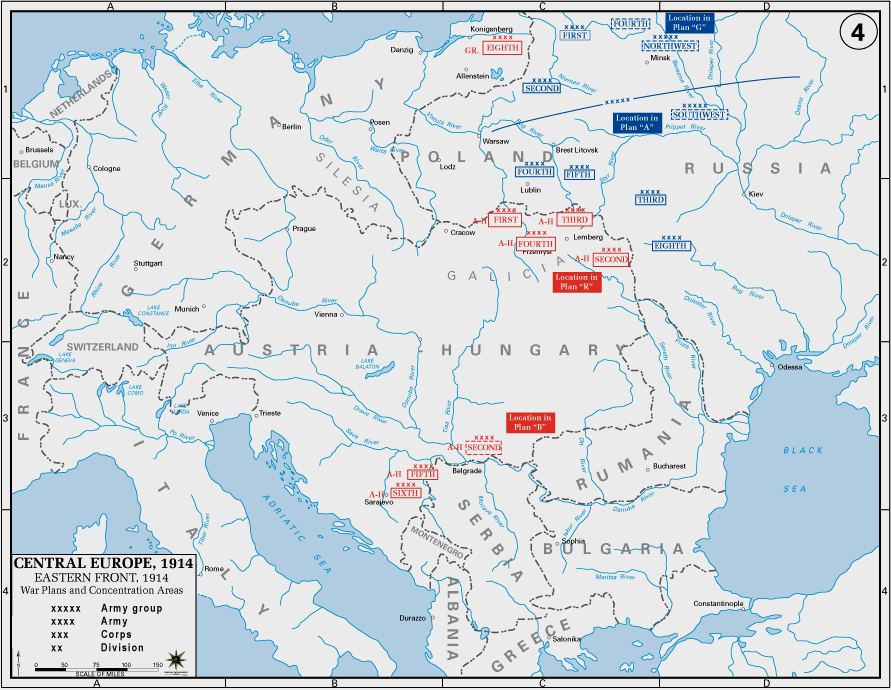
The Eastern Front, as it was in 1914, with the long-occupied territories of the Polish-Lithuanian Commonwealth in the top centre.

This article lists Imperial Russian Army formations and units in 1914 prior to the mobilisation for the Russian invasion of Prussia and the offensive into the Austro-Hungarian province of Galicia.

The prewar chain of command was: military district, corps (or Army corps), then to division, brigade, regiment, and then the regiment's battalions.

After mobilisation in the event of war the chain of command of the Imperial Russian Army ran from Stavka, the Russian general headquarters, which was created during mobilization, to Front-level (Army group) also created during mobilization, to the Army level. Army headquarters were created during mobilization by transformation of the military district headquarters. Below Army level the chain was the same as in peace-time; corps (or Army corps (terms used interchangeably), division, brigade, and regiment.

Abbreviations used

- ACorps = Army Corps (ak = armeysky korpus)
- MD = Military district (VO = voenny okrug)
- GrenCorps = Grenadier Corps (Gren. k = Grenadersky korpus)
- LGrd = Lifeguard (l.-gv. = leyb-gvardi)
- SibCorps = Siberian Corps (Sib. k = Sibirsky korpus)
- TurkCorps = Turkestan Corps (Turk. k = Turkestansky korpus)

== Fronts ==
- Northwestern Front (until August 1915)
  - Northern Front (from August 1915)
  - Western Front (from August 1915)
- Southwestern Front
- Romanian Front
- Caucasus Front

== Armies ==
see List of Russian armies in World War I

== The Guards ==
=== 1st Guards Corps ===
Located in Saint Petersburg and surroundings — Pushkin, Petergof and Gatchina, excepted the 3rd Infantry Division (3 ID) and the Independent Cavalry Brigade (ICavBr), located in Warsaw and subordinated to the XXIII AC

Formation, unit	established
Infantry
1st Guards Infantry Division	
LGrd Preobrazhensky Regiment	1683
LGrd Semyonovsky Regiment	1683
LGrd Izmaylovsky Regiment	1730
LGrd Jaeger Regiment	1796 – battalion (1806)
2nd Guards Infantry Division	
LGrd Moscow Regiment	1811 (established as Lithuanian LGrd Regiment, in 1817 — renamed to LGrd Moscow Regiment)
LGrd Grenadier Regiment	1756 – 1st -й Grenadier Regiment (1813)
LGrd Pavlovsky Regiment	1796, under the patronage of Paul I of Russia (ru: Pavel), received the name of the Imperator, as Pavlovsky Regiment (1813)
LGrd Finland Regiment	1806 – Battalion of the Imperial Militsiya (1808)
3rd Guards Infantry Division	
Guards Rifle Brigade	from 1915 Division
Cavalry
1st Guards Cavalry Division	
2nd Guards Cavalry Division	
Independent Guards Cavalry Brigade	in Warsaw
LGrd Uhlan Regiment	1817
LGrd Grodnensky Hussars Regiment	1824

== Fortresses ==
- Brest-Litovsk Fortress
- Warsaw Fortress
- Ivangorod Fortress
- Zegrze Fortress
- Łomża
- Novogeorgievsk Fortress
- Osowiec Fortress
- Ostrolenka
- Pułtusk
- Rozhany
- Grodno
- Daugavpils Fortress
- Kaunas Fortress
- Libava
- Olita
- Ust-Dvinsk
- Alexandropol
- Kars
- Mikhaylovsk (St. Michael's) fortress (Batumi)
- Vyborg
- Kronstadt
- Peter and Paul Fortress (St. Petersburg)

== Army Corps ==
- 1st Army Corps (Russian Empire)
- 2nd Army Corps (Russian Empire)
- 3rd Army Corps (Russian Empire)
- 4th Army Corps (Russian Empire)
- 5th Army Corps (Russian Empire)
- 6th Army Corps (Russian Empire)
- 7th Army Corps (Russian Empire)
- 8th Army Corps (Russian Empire)
- 9th Army Corps (Russian Empire)
- 10th Army Corps (Russian Empire)
- 11th Army Corps (Russian Empire)
- 12th Army Corps (Russian Empire)
- 13th Army Corps (Russian Empire)
- 14th Army Corps (Russian Empire)
- 15th Army Corps (Russian Empire)
- 16th Army Corps (Russian Empire)
- 17th Army Corps (Russian Empire)
- 18th Army Corps (Russian Empire)
- 19th Army Corps (Russian Empire)
- 20th Army Corps (Russian Empire)
- 21st Army Corps (Russian Empire)
- 22nd Army Corps (Russian Empire)
- 23rd Army Corps (Russian Empire)
- 24th Army Corps (Russian Empire)
- 25th Army Corps (Russian Empire)
- 26th Army Corps (Russian Empire)
- 27th Army Corps (Russian Empire)
- 28th Army Corps (Russian Empire)
- 29th Army Corps (Russian Empire)
- 30th Army Corps (Russian Empire)
- 31st Army Corps (Russian Empire)
- 32nd Army Corps (Russian Empire)
- 33rd Army Corps (Russian Empire)
- 34th Army Corps (Russian Empire)
- 35th Army Corps (Russian Empire)
- 36th Army Corps (Russian Empire)
- 37th Army Corps (Russian Empire)
- 38th Army Corps (Russian Empire)
- 39th Army Corps (Russian Empire)
- 40th Army Corps (Russian Empire)
- 41st Army Corps (Russian Empire)
- 42nd Army Corps (Russian Empire)
- 43rd Army Corps (Russian Empire)
- 44th Army Corps (Russian Empire)
- 45th Army Corps (Russian Empire)
- 46th Army Corps (Russian Empire)
- 47th Army Corps (Russian Empire)
- 48th Army Corps (Russian Empire)
- 49th Army Corps (Russian Empire)
- 50th Army Corps (Russian Empire)

== Cavalry Corps ==
- 1st Cavalry Corps (Russian Empire)
- 2nd Cavalry Corps (Russian Empire)
- 3rd Cavalry Corps (Russian Empire)
- 4th Cavalry Corps (Russian Empire)
- 5th Cavalry Corps (Russian Empire)
- 6th Cavalry Corps (Russian Empire)
- 7th Cavalry Corps (Russian Empire)
- 1st Caucasian Cavalry Corps (Russian Empire)
- 2nd Caucasian Cavalry Corps (Russian Empire)

== Cavalry Divisions ==
- 1st Cavalry Division (Russian Empire)
- 2nd Cavalry Division (Russian Empire)
- 3rd Cavalry Division (Russian Empire)
- 4th Cavalry Division (Russian Empire)
- 5th Cavalry Division (Russian Empire)
- 6th Cavalry Division (Russian Empire)
- 7th Cavalry Division (Russian Empire)
- 8th Cavalry Division (Russian Empire)
- 9th Cavalry Division (Russian Empire)
- 10th Cavalry Division (Russian Empire)
- 11th Cavalry Division (Russian Empire)
- 12th Cavalry Division (Russian Empire)
- 13th Cavalry Division (Russian Empire)
- 14th Cavalry Division (Russian Empire)
- 15th Cavalry Division (Russian Empire)
- 16th Cavalry division (Russian Empire)
- Caucasian Cavalry division (Russian Empire)

== Cossack Divisions ==
- 1st Caucasus Cossack Division (Russian Empire)
- 2nd Caucasus Cossack Division (Russian Empire)
- 3rd Caucasus Cossack Division (Russian Empire)
- 4th Caucasus Cossack Division (Russian Empire)
- 5th Caucasus Cossack Division (Russian Empire)
- 1st Don Cossack Division (Russian Empire)
- 2nd Combined Cossack Division (Russian Empire)
- 3rd Don Cossack Division (Russian Empire)
- 4th Don Cossack division (Russian Empire)
- 5th Don Cossack division (Russian Empire)
- 9th Don Cossack division (Russian Empire)
- 14th Don Cossack division (Russian Empire)
- 1st Transbaikal Cossack division (Russian Empire)
- 1st Turkestan Cossack division (Russian Empire)
- Transcaspian Cossack brigade (Russian Empire)
- Caucasian Native Cavalry Division

== See also ==
- Military district (Russian Empire) - list of military districts.
- Women's Battalion

== Bibliography ==
- Ėmmanuelʹ, V. A. (2013). The Russian Imperial Cavalry in 1914 (First Winged Hussar Publishing ed.). Point Pleasant, NJ: Winged Hussar Publishing LLC. ISBN 978-0988953215.
- Deyo, Daniel C. (2016). A Compendium of the Russian Army in the First World War (Legions of the East ed.). Great Falls, VA: Counterintelligence Consulting LLC. ISBN 9781540399311.
