= Evgeny Radkevich =

Russian general (1851–1930)

General of the Infantry Evgeny Aleksandrovich Radkevich
- Евгений Александрович Радкевич
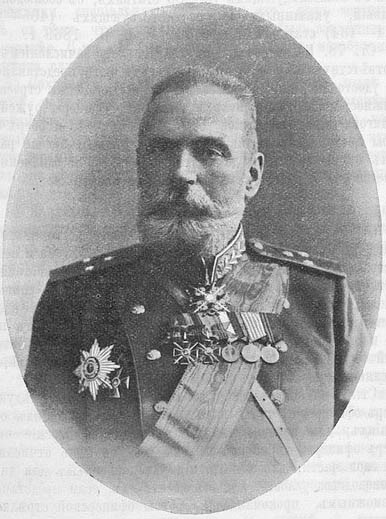
- Radkevitch in 1914
- Born: 16 September 1851; Vitebsk Governorate, Russian Empire
- Died: 1930 (aged 78–79); Soviet Union
- Education: Second Moscow Cadet Corps
- Military career
- Allegiance: (Russian Empire) Imperial Russian Army (1872–1917); (Russia) Russian Army (1917); Red Army (1918–1923)
- Service years: 1872–1912, 1914–1918, 1918–1923
- Rank: General of the infantry
- Commands: 6th Battery, 3rd Regiment; 3rd Regiment; 6th Mortar Artillery Regiment; 10th Artillery Brigade; 72nd Infantry Division; 10th Infantry Division; Łódź Garrison; 3rd Siberian Army Corps; Irkutsk Military District; 10th Army; Petrograd Military District
- Conflicts: Russo-Turkish War; Russo-Japanese War; Battle of Shaho; Battle of Sandepu; Battle of Mukden; World War I; East Prussian Campaign; Battle on the Neman River; Second Battle of the Masurian Lakes; Vilno-Dvinsk offensive; Sventiany Offensive; Lake Naroch Offensive; Baranovichi Offensive
- Awards: Order of Saint Stanislaus; Order of Saint Vladimir; Order of Saint Anna; Golden Weapon for Bravery; Order of the White Eagle; Order of Saint Alexander Nevsky

Evgeny Aleksandrovich Radkevich (Russian: Евгений Александрович Радкевич; 16 September 1851 – 1930) was an Imperial Russian Army general of the infantry and a member of the Military Council. He saw combat during the Russo-Turkish War of 1877–1878 and the Russo-Japanese War and served as a commander of Russian field armies during World War I.

== Biography ==
=== Early life ===
Descended from hereditary nobles of the Vitebsk Governorate, Radkevich was born there on 16 September 1851. He studied in the Polotsk cadet corps. On 15 August 1869 he entered the 2nd Konstantinovsk Military School. He transferred to the Nikolaev Engineering School, from which he graduated in the first category on 22 June 1872.

=== Early military service ===
After graduation, Radkevich was commissioned as an ensign on 22 June 1872 — with a date of seniority of 11 August 1871 — into the 19th Artillery Brigade at Stavropol in the Caucasus Military District. He was promoted to second lieutenant on 6 November 1872 and to lieutenant on 29 December 1873. In 1874 he was sent to Saint Petersburg for admission to the Nikolaev Engineering Academy, but he could not pass the examinations returned for service in the same brigade. Promoted to staff captain with a date of seniority of 12 September 1876, Radkevich participated in the Russo-Turkish War of 1877–1878. For serving with distinctions during the war, he was awarded two orders and promoted to captain on 6 November 1878, with a date of rank of 6 September 1877.

From 12 September to 1 November 1885, Radkevich served in the Caucasian Military District. In 1886 he graduated from the Artillery Officer School.

On 30 July 1889, Radkevich was promoted to lieutenant colonel, and on the same day he became the commander of the 6th Battery of the 3rd Regiment of the 31st Artillery Brigade at Belgorod in the Kiev Military District. He was promoted to colonel on 30 August 1894. On 1 January 1898 he took command of the 3rd Regiment itself. On 29 December 1899 he became the commander of the 6th Mortar Artillery Regiment at Kherson in the Odessa Military District. On 2 October 1902, he was promoted for distinction to major general, with a date of seniority of 3 October 1902. On 3 December 1902 he took command of the 10th Artillery Brigade in the V Army Corps at Łódź in the Warsaw Military District.

=== Russo-Japanese War ===
The Russo-Japanese War began on 8 February 1904, and on 18 June 1904 the Imperial Russian Army began the formation of the 6th Siberian Army Corps, consisting of the 55th and 72nd Infantry Divisions. On 27 July 1904, Radkevich's 10th Artillery Brigade became part of the new corps. The corps completed its formation in July 1904, and in September 1904 it became part of the 1st Manchurian Army. He saw action with the 10th Artillery Brigade in the Battle of Shaho in October 1904. On 11 December 1904, he became chief of artillery of the 6th Siberian Army Corps, and in that position participated in the Battle of Sandepu in January 1905. On 4 February 1905 he became provisional commander of the 72nd Infantry Division, leading it in the Battle of Mukden in February–March 1905. Official approval of his command of the division was promulgated on 27 May 1905. For his Russo-Japanese War service he was awarded the Order of Saint Stanislaus First Class with Swords, the Order of Saint Anna First Class with Swords, and the Golden Weapon for Bravery.

=== Between the wars ===
After the Russo-Japanese War ended in August 1905, Radkevich remained in command of the 72nd Infantry Division. From 3 February 1906 to 14 June 1908 he commanded the 10th Infantry Division, simultaneously he serving as interim Governor-General of Petrokov Province from 30 July 1906 to 5 September 1907 an as commander of the Łódź Garrison from 22 January 1908.

From 14 June 1908 to 1 September 1912, Radkevich was commander of the 3rd Siberian Army Corps, simultaneously serving as temporary commander of the Irkutsk Military District from 11 December 1909 to 6 February 1910 and again from 20 December 1910 to 20 February 1911. He retired on 1 September 1912, and on 9 September 1912 received a promotion in retirement to general of the infantry on 9 September 1912, with a date of rank of 8 May 1912.

=== World War I ===
The Russian Empire entered World War I on 1 August 1914. On 7 August 1914, Radkevich returned to active duty and was re-appointed commander of the 3rd Siberian Army Corps, which became part of the new 10th Army. During the Russian invasion of East Prussia, the 10th Army began fighting the Imperial German Army's 8th Army in the Augustów Forest on 15 September 1914. Although the 10th Army's 2nd Caucasian Army Corps and the 22nd Army Corps failed to achieve their objectives, Radkevich's 3rd Siberian Army Corps succeeded in occupying Augustów and cutting off German communications. On 16 and 17 September 1914, the 10th Army turned the front to the left, and Radkevich's fought stubbornly in battles near Augustów while other army corps also went over to the offensive and cleared the Augustów Forest of German forces. The 10th Army took about 3,000 prisoners and captured 20 guns. For his performance in these operations, Radkevich was awarded the Order of Saint George Fourth Class.

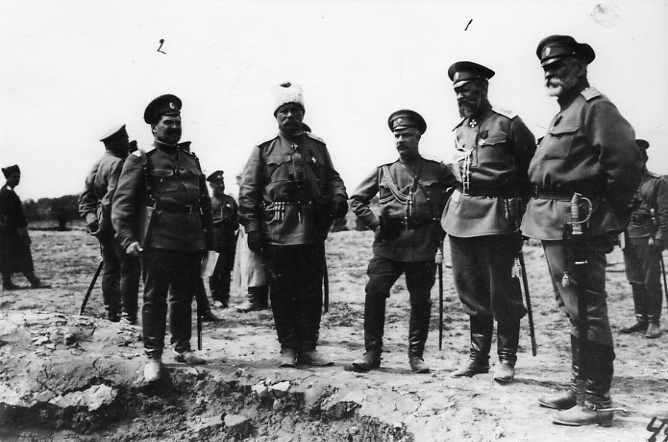
Reviewing troops of the Imperial Russian Army's Western Front in 1916. From left to right: Radkevich (then commander of the 10th Army), General of the Infantry Aleksei Evert (commander of the Western Front), an unidentified officer, General of the Cavalry Alexander Litvinov (commander of the 1st Army), and Colonel P. P. Lebedev (Quartermaster General of the Western Front).

In October and November 1914, the 10th Army fought local battles without any connection with the main operations on the Eastern Front. In early December 1914, the 10th Army launched a new offensive, but could not break through the fortified front of the German 8th Army and suffered heavy losses. In early January 1915, the 10th Army conducted the Lasdenen operation, which did not bring the success the Imperial Russian Army expected of it.

In February 1915, the 3rd Siberian Army Corps participated in the Second Battle of the Masurian Lakes. On 7 February 1915, the German 8th Army attacked the left flank of the Russian 10th Army. The next day, the German 10th Army launched an offensive in the rear of the Russian 10th Army, inflicting a major blow on the right flank of the 3rd Siberian Army Corps, driving the 26th Army Corps out of its positions and forcing it to retreat. The retreat exposed the left flank of the 20th Army Corps, which the Germans subsequently surrounded and defeated in the vicinity of the Augustów Forest. On the left flank of the 10th Army in the Ełk–Rajgród sector. Radkevich's 3rd Siberian Corps alone confronted the German 8th and 10th Armies (totaling about three corps) and held off three German attacks, saving the 10th Army from complete destruction. Even the German General Erich Ludendorff expressed admiration for Radkevich's actions.

After the German defeat of the 10th Army in the Second Battle of the Masurian Lakes, Radkevich relieved Thadeus von Sivers as commander of the 10th Army on 25 April 1915. According to the Russian military historian A. A. Kersnovsky in History of the Russian Army, “An excellent corps commander, General Radkevich felt insecure at the head of the army and needed a mentor.” Radkevich commanded the 10th Army during the Battle of Vilnius in August–September 1915, the Sventiany Offensive in September–October 1915, the Lake Naroch Offensive in March 1916, and the Baranovichi Offensive in July 1916. On 4 October 1916, Radkevich was appointed a member of the Military Council of the Russian Empire.

=== Revolution and Russian Civil War ===
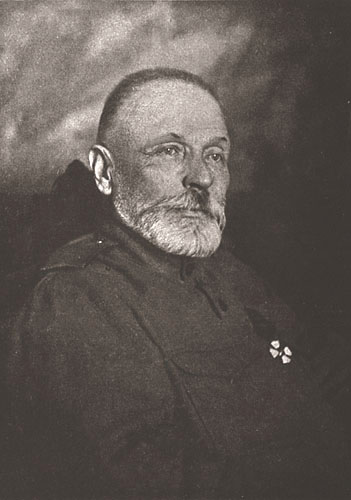
Radkevich in 1917.

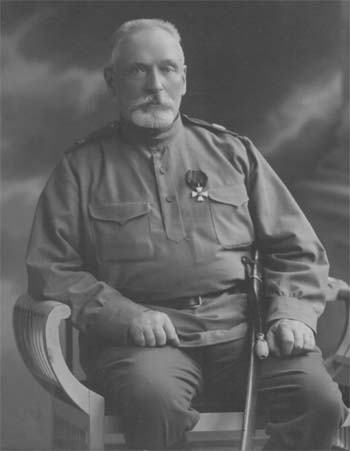
Radkevich sometime before 1918.

In the wake of the February Revolution of 1917, Radkevich remained in the Russian Army of the Russian Republic under the Russian Provisional Government. On 25 April 1917 he became the assistant to the commander of the Petrograd Military District, Lavr Kornilov, and on 29 April 1917 he relieved Kornilov as commander of the district. On 6 May 1917 he again became a member of the Military Council.

In the October Revolution in 1917, the Bolsheviks toppled the Russian Provisional Government and the Russian Civil War began. On 21 March 1918, Radkevich was dismissed from the service, and he officially retired again in November 1918.

In 1918 he was mobilized in the Red Army. In the early 1920s he taught topography at the Odessa Artillery School. G. D. Plaskov, then a cadet, recalled in 1969 in Under the Roar of the Cannonade:

A 72-year-old Radkevich, a former tsarist general, left a fond memories. A cheerful, humorous old man, he often often came [to class] by bicycle with a bag full of groceries. He was well provided for financially; on the orders of the Revolutionary Military Council of the Republic [i.e., the Russian Soviet Federated Socialist Republic], he received a special ration. Before starting classes, Radkevich opened his bag and laid out tiny sandwiches on a snow-white napkin. "Sir Junker, do not offend the old mother" — so he called his wife — "she prepared it for you, eat, we still have left, do not be shy!" It was impossible to refuse: the eyes of this wise and kind man shone very kindly.

He cared for us as sons. In the evenings he came to our room [and] sat down at the table. He wiped his sweating face and said in a voice that allowed no objections: "Come on, gentlemen, show your calendars. How did you prepare for tomorrow?" [We would] carefully check our notes [and] drawings, correct errors, explain them. Somehow he brought a beautiful folder, pulled out from it photographs of his sons, officers, just like him, who had switched over to serve the people. He joyfully, excitedly talked about his meeting with Lenin.

I agreed with him about everything, we understood each other perfectly. And I immediately obeyed him, and the three of us joined the Red Army. The "old mother" was against it, but we persuaded her ...

He talked a lot about the Russo-Japanese [War] and World War I. "And you know, in 1915, I presented to His Majesty the Emperor of Russia documents on the subject of the assignment of the rank of Colonel Nikolai Iosifovich Bettikher; in those years he commanded a heavy artillery division for me..." And it became clear to us why the commandant of the school was pulled at the sight of this teacher.

Radkevich was always busy. The cleanly decorated topography room was filled by cadets during free hours. Maps, schemes of various scales hung on the walls, [and] educational exhibits were neatly arranged. On the tables lay massive multi-colored pencils, erasers, workbeds, sheets of Whatman paper, tracing paper — the general brought most of these scarce things from home. Radkevich circulated among the cadets, advised them, showed them things. We studied here not only topography - the old teacher willingly gave advice on other disciplines.

When choosing a presidium at ceremonial meetings, he received dozens of votes. Shy, he climbed onto the stage and sat modestly in the second row. "The commissioner or the head of the school approached him and sat next to him."

In 1923, Radkevich retired due to age. He died in 1930.

== Personal life ==
Radkevich was a member of the Russian Orthodox Church. Although his last name is spelled universally as "Radkevich," all his relatives bore (and still bear) the surname Rodkevich (Ukrainian: Родкевич), the Ukrainian spelling of the Russian "Radkevich."

Radkevich's wife was Elena Ivanovna Rodkevich nee Linovitskaya (1859-1935), the daughter of an Imperial Russian Army colonel, who acquired a secondary education. The couple had five children. After she was widowed in 1930, she resided in Leningrad and received a personal pension for her husband's military service. Blind and deaf in her later years, she needed constant assistance. Deemed a "particularly dangerous element" by the Soviet government she was arrested, she was sent to Orenburg on 5 March 1935 for five years, but died that year.

Radkevich's two eldest children were his daughters Inna Evgenievna Dushkevich nee Rodkevich (21 June 1883 – 1965) and Kira Evgenievna Rodkevich (25 September 1884, Saint Petersburg — 1935). Kira was educated at the Kherson girls' gymnasium and lived in Leningrad in the 1930s. She committed suicide in 1935 after the arrest that year of her mother and her eldest brother, Vadim. She was rehabilitated on 6 September 1989 by a decision of the Leningrad prosecutor's office.

Radkevich's eldest son, Vadim Evgenievich Rodkevich (13 June 1886, Tsarskoye Selo – 19 May 1937), graduated from the Second Moscow Cadet Corps. During World War I he served as an officer in the Imperial Russian Army. In the 1930s he lived in Leningrad. Deemed like his mother a "particularly dangerous element" by the Soviet government, he was arrested on 17 March 1935 and sent to Orenburg for five years. On 26 September 1936 he was arrested again in Orenburg. On 3 March 1937, he was sentenced by the Special Conference of the NKVD to five years in prison for participating in a counter-revolutionary organization and was imprisoned at Buzuluk, where he died. He was rehabilitated on 29 February 2008 by the decision of the prosecutor's office of St. Petersburg.

Radkevich's second son, Igor Evgenievich Rodkevich (13 October 1888—?), also graduated from the Second Moscow Cadet Corps, and then the Tomsk Technological Institute. In 1911, he was expelled from the Russian Empire until 1913 for participating in a strike at the Tomsk Technological Institute. In World War I he served as an officer in the Imperial Russian Army.

Rodkevich's youngest son, Gleb Evgenievich Rodkevich, (20 June 1892 – 1929), graduated from the Łódź Classical Gymnasium and the Second Moscow Cadet Corps. He participated in World War I from 1914, first as a staff captain, then as a captain of the Life Guards of the 2nd Artillery Brigade, and he was awarded with St. George Sword for bravery by Order No. 689 of the Russian 11th Army of 10 November 1917. During the Russian Civil War he fought in the White Army, serving from 1918 to 1920 first as the commander of an artillery battery, then as the commander of a division. In 1920 he was arrested by the Bolsheviks, transferred to Moscow, and imprisoned in Butyrka prison. At the end of 1920, he was sentenced to imprisonment until the end of the Russian Civil War and was detained at the Novospassky Monastery. On 23 May 1924 he was sentenced to two years in prison and served time in the Solovki prison camp. He was rehabilitated on 10 April 1992 by a decision of the prosecutor's office of the Leningrad Military District.

== Awards and honors ==
- Order of Saint Anna, Third Class, with Swords and Bow (13 July 1877)
- Order of Saint Vladimir, Fourth Class, with Swords and Bow (28 May 1880)
- Order of Saint Stanislaus, Second Class (26 February 1886)
- Order of Saint Anna, Second Class (1 February 1887)
- Order of Saint Vladimir, Third Class (15 May 1899)
- Order of Saint Stanislaus, First Class with Swords (11 June 1905)
- Order of Saint Anna, First Class, with Swords (8 October 1905)
- Golden Weapon for Bravery (7 April 1906)
- Order of Saint Vladimir, Second Class (6 November 1911)
- Order of St. George, Fourth Class (22 September 1914)
- Order of the White Eagle with Swords (25 October 1914)
- Order of Saint Alexander Nevsky with Swords (25 December 1915)
