= 2nd Caucasus Army Corps =

1st Cavalry Corps
- Country: Russian Empire
- Allegiance: Imperial Russian Army
- Engagements: World War I

The 2nd Caucasian Army Corps (Russian: 2-й Кавказский армейский корпус) was a division of the military of the Russian Empire which existed from 1879 to 1918, including the time period of World War I.

== Composition ==
- 51st Infantry Division

== Part of ==
- 10th Army: 1914
- 1st Army: 1914–1915
- 9th Army: 1915
- 13th Army: 1915
- 10th Army: 1915–1917

== Commanders ==
- General G. J. Berchman: 1914
- General Samad bey Mehmandarov: 1914–1917
- Lieutenant General G. I. Choglokov: 1917
