= 10th Army (Russian Empire) =

- Active: September 1914 – early 1918
- Country: Russian Empire
- Branch: Imperial Russian Army
- Type: Field army
- Engagements: World War I

Commanders
- Notable commanders: Ali-Agha Shikhlinski

The 10th Army (Russian: 10-я армия) was a field army of the Imperial Russian Army during the First World War.

== History ==
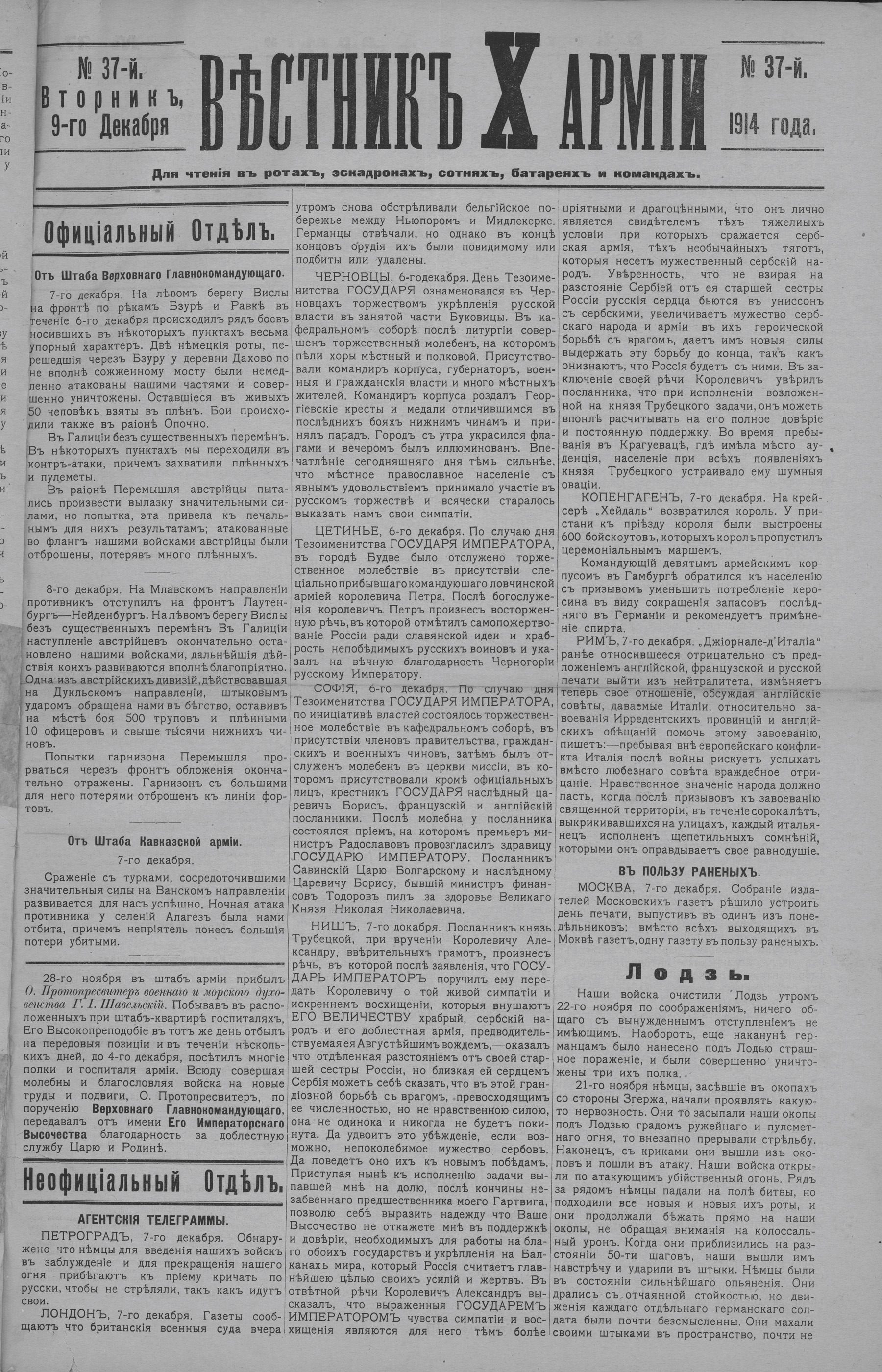
A page from the army newspaper, Vestnik X Armii

The 10th Army was formed on 5 September [O.S. 23 August] 1914 from reserve units of the Stavka of the Commander-in-Chief, part of the Northwestern Front, and initially included the 22nd Army Corps, the 3rd Siberian Army Corps, and the 1st Turkestan Army Corps, under the command of Lieutenant General Vasily Flug. Subsequently, the army would also include the 1st Guards, 1st, 2nd, 3rd, 5th, 6th, 10th, 15th, 20th, 23rd, 24th, 26th, 34th, 35th, 36th, 38th, and 44th Army Corps, the 2nd and 5th Caucasus Army Corps, the 1st and 2nd Siberian Army Corps, and the 7th Cavalry Corps at different times.

The army was deployed between the 1st and 2nd Armies during the East Prussian Campaign of 17 August to 15 September 1914, covering the left flank of the 1st Army along with the 2nd Army. During the Russian retreat from East Prussia it defended the line of the Bobr River and covered the direction of Augustów and Grodno. The 1st and 10th Armies covered the right flank of the Northwestern Front during the Warsaw–Ivangorod Operation of 15 September to 25 October. General of infantry Thadeus von Sievers replaced Flug on 23 September. During the Łódź Operation of 29 October to 11 November, the troops of the 1st and 10th Armies covered the Mława direction on the right bank of the Vistula. In the battle on the Neman River, she was able to successfully recapture the Baltic territories captured by the Germans, the main operations took place on the Neman River and in the city of Suwalki. In the subsequent offensive into East Prussia, the army was halted by strongly fortified and held German fortifications at the Masurian Lakes and was unable to capture them.

Between 25 January and 13 February 1915, the army fought in the Second Battle of the Masurian Lakes, during which the German 8th and 10th Armies were to encircle and destroy the 10th Army by attacking it from the flanks. The German 8th Army struck the 10th Army's left towards Augustow on 25 January, while the German 10th Army attacked on the right towards Verzhbolovo and Suwałki between 26 and 30 January. In intense defensive fighting, the troops of the 10th Army held back the German advance for ten days, enabling the main Russian forces to retreat to the Kovno and Osovets line by 13 February. The army rebuffed another unsuccessful German encirclement attempt during the First Battle of Przasnysz between 7 February and 17 March. On 17 February, the 10th Army, in concert with the 1st and 12th Armies, launched a counteroffensive and pushed the German troops back to the East Prussian border, overcoming fierce resistance. The main battles took place around the Grodno fortress, where the army won a convincing victory. Sievers was replaced by General of infantry Yevgeny Radkovich on 25 April.

When the Northwestern Front was split in August, the 10th Army became part of the Western Front, with which it fought for the rest of the war. It fought in the Battle of Vilna between 9 August and 26 September against the German 10th Army. After capturing Kovno on 9 August, the latter attacked between the Viliya and the Neman, attempting to encircle the main forces of the army, concentrated north and northwest of Vilna. In seesaw fighting that lasted until the end of August, both sides suffered heavy losses. The stalemate was broken by the German Sventiany Offensive, beginning on 27 August, which broke through the army defenses and unhinged its rear with a cavalry raid, forcing a retreat to the east. The front stabilized along the line of Lake Naroch and Smorgon by 19 September, after which positional fighting took place.

In the northern hemisphere spring of 1916, the army fought in the Northern and Western Fronts' Lake Naroch Offensive, tasked with advancing on Vilna, but did not achieve its objectives due to a lack of shells and ineffective command of the troops. In the operation, significant groups of German troops were encircled, which prevented German reinforcement of the Western Front. The 10th Army fought in the mid-1917 Kerensky Offensive, under the command of Lieutenant General Pyotr Lomnovsky, tasked with the front's main assault from Molodechno to Vilna. Preceded by a three-day artillery preparation, the army's units began the attack on 9 July, but its troops refused to fight, occupying two to three lines of German trenches before returning to their positions. The offensive was halted on 10 July as a result of the failure of the concurrent attacks of the Southwestern Front.

The Russian Army disintegrated as a result of the Russian Revolution, resulting in the demobilization of the troops of the army between December and February 1918, before its disbandment in March.

== Military Fronts and engagements in which the 10th Army participated ==
The army was part of the following fronts during the war:

- Northwestern Front (August 1914 – August 1915)
- Western Front (August 1915 – the beginning of 1918)

=== Engagements ===
- Second Battle of the Masurian Lakes (7–22 February 1915)

== Commanders ==
The following officers commanded the army:

- General of the Infantry Alexei Evert (11–22 August 1914)
- Lieutenant General Vasily Flug (22 August – 23 September 1914)
- General of infantry Thadeus von Sievers (23 September 1914 – 25 April 1915)
- General of infantry Yevgeny Radkovich (25 April 1915 – October 1916)
- General of cavalry Afanasy Tsurikov (October – 12 December 1916)
- General of infantry Vladimir Gorbatovsky (12 December 1916 – 2 April 1917)
- Lieutenant General Nikolai Kiselevsky (9 April – 12 July 1917)
- Lieutenant General Pyotr Lomnovsky (12 July – 9 September 1917)
- Major General Ali-Agha Shikhlinski (9 September – 16 November 1917)

== See also ==
- List of Russian armies in World War I
- List of Imperial Russian Army formations and units
