= 38th Army Corps (Russian Empire) =

- Country: Russian Empire
- Allegiance: Imperial Russian Army
- Engagements: World War I

The 38th Army Corps was an Army corps in the Imperial Russian Army.

== Part of ==
The corps was part of the following units during its existence:

- 13th Army (from 24 July 1915)
- 1st Army (12 August–1 September 1915)
- 10th Army (18 September 1915–December 1917)

== Commanders ==
The corps was commanded by the following officers:

- Lieutenant General Vasily Artemyev (8 June 1915–31 October 1916)
- Lieutenant General Mikhail Sokovnin (31 October 1916–22 April 1917)
- Lieutenant General Józef Dowbor-Muśnicki (28 April–23 August 1917)
- Lieutenant General Alexander Dobryshin (from 23 August 1917)
