= Battle of Augustov =

Battle of Augustov, Augustów, Augustovo, Augustowo, Augustow or Augustavas may refer to one of the following events:

- Two battles during World War I:
  - Battle of Augustów (1914), also known as the Battle of the Niemen
  - Second Battle of the Masurian Lakes (1915), known in Russia as the Battle of Augustowo
- Several actions during the Polish–Lithuanian War of 1919–20
