= Second Russian invasion of East Prussia (1914) =

Military operation in the First World War

Second East Prussian campaign
- Part of the Eastern Front of World War I
Date	27 September – 2 November 1914
Location	East Prussia, German Empire
Result	Indecisive (Note: The first part of the operation was extremely successful for the Russians, they knocked the Germans off the borders and occupied a significant part of East Prussia. Russians lost the advantage in numbers, because the Germans were more technically equipped, they had to abandon the plan to take Konigsberg and East Prussia turned into a bridgehead, where the Russians held significant enemy forces for a long time, which greatly helped to win the battles in Poland. Russians ended the battle with a small tactical success and a strategic draw, however, the Russians were able to transfer part of their forces to Poland, but the Germans did not, moreover, the latter were forced to send reinforcements to East Prussia. The German command covered the operation as its victory, and the Russian as its own, Although from the point of view of subsequent events, the battle really ended in favor of the Russians)
Territorial changes	Russians captures part of East Prussia

Belligerents
German Empire	Russian Empire

Commanders and leaders
(German Empire) Hermann von François	(Russian Empire) Nikolai Ruzsky

Units involved
(German Empire) 8th Army	(Russian Empire) 1st Army (Note: Only one corps) (Russian Empire) 10th Army

Strength
On 20 September 1914; 129,814 men 354 machine guns 540 guns	On 28 September 1914; Total 525,682 men 10 Army; 247,467 men 565 machine guns 749 guns 1 Army; 278,215 men 272 machine guns 648 guns

Casualties and losses
Official German medical reports: 5,250 KIA, 18,169 WIA, 4,930 MIA; Total 28,349 lost: 9 machine guns 9 guns	Official Russian medical reports: 14,762 KIA, 53,692 WIA, 32,169 MIA; Total 101,290 lost: 65 machine guns 64 guns

The offensive of the Russian armies in October 1914 with the aim of capturing East Prussia after in Battle of Augustów (1914).

== Background ==
The situation in the armies of the Russian Northwestern Front at the beginning of September 1914 was determined by the consequences of the East Prussian operation, which ended in the defeat of the Russian 2nd Army and the heavy defeat of the 1st Army. In August, the arriving corps of the Russian 10th Army began to occupy the front between them; however, their attempt to go on the offensive “on wheels” to change the course of the First Battle of the Masurian Lakes failed. The troops of the 1st Army retreated across the Neman River in mid-September and began to strengthen positions on the eastern bank of the river. The corps of the 10th Army left Augustow and Suwalki, finding themselves under the threat of a German flank attack. The actions of both armies began to be subordinated to the goal of preventing German troops from crossing the Neman River from Kovno to Grodno. The actions of the German 8th Army were aimed at creating the most convenient bridgehead for both defense and a possible offensive in the Baltic states, and after the start of the offensive of the Central Powers on the middle Vistula - at pinning down the opposing Russian forces.

To the newly appointed Commander-in-Chief of the armies of the North-Western Front, Infantry General Nikolai Ruzsky, the Supreme Commander-in-Chief General of the Cavalry, Grand Duke Nikolai Nikolaevich, in a special telegram dated September 17, 1914, granted “complete freedom of decision within the boundaries of the front entrusted to him and the troops subordinate to him.” . Decisions were also made to immediately replenish the troops of the Russian 1st Army by separating personnel from the 6th Army, located in the Petrograd Military District (20 marching battalions) and disbanding the remnants of the Russian 54th and 72nd infantry, defeated by the Germans divisions. On September 20, 1914, N. Ruzsky gave a directive to the subordinate armies: the 1st Army – to defend crossings across the Neman River, the 10th Army – to cover Białystok, Grodno, the 2nd Army – to retreat to the Narew River.

In the plans of the Russian Headquarters, passive defense was excluded. On September 28, transmitting the directive on the offensive into Silesia by the forces of the Russian South-Western Front, the chief of staff of the Supreme Commander-in-Chief, Lieutenant General Nikolai Yanushkevich, ordered the armies of the North-Western Front “after the final production of the 1st Army, which must be rushed, to launch a general offensive against enemy acting from East Prussia. At the same time, one must take into account the preservation of the left-flank army's ability to provide quick and direct assistance to the armies of the Southwestern Front during their initial operations on the banks of the Vistula.”

Significant changes took place in the German troops of the 8th Army. For the offensive on the Vistula River and direct support of the Austro-Hungarian troops who had already retreated across the San River and towards Krakow, the 9th Army was formed, which included the Guards Reserve Corps, withdrawn from the 8th Army, and the XI, XVII and XX Corps with 8th Cavalry Division. The command of the new army was entrusted to Colonel General P. von Hindenburg, and E. Ludendorff became his chief of staff. In the ranks of the 8th Army (by September 20, 1914) 129,814 military personnel remained in service.

Command was transferred to artillery general Richard von Schubert. The remaining forces were gathered into several groups with the task of preventing the development of operations of Russian troops against East Prussia and preventing a new Russian invasion.

Thus, by the beginning of the new phase of the struggle for East Prussia, Russian troops outnumbered the German defenders of the province by 4 times in the number of troops, in machine guns by more than twice, in artillery by 2.6 times. The balance of forces for the Russian armies of the Northwestern Front was even more favorable than at the beginning of the war. But the troops of the 1st Army and half of the corps of the 10th Army had unsuccessful battle experience; a heavy defeat on the Masurian lakes had a negative impact on the combat effectiveness and morale of the troops.

== Battles on the Neman River in September 1914 ==
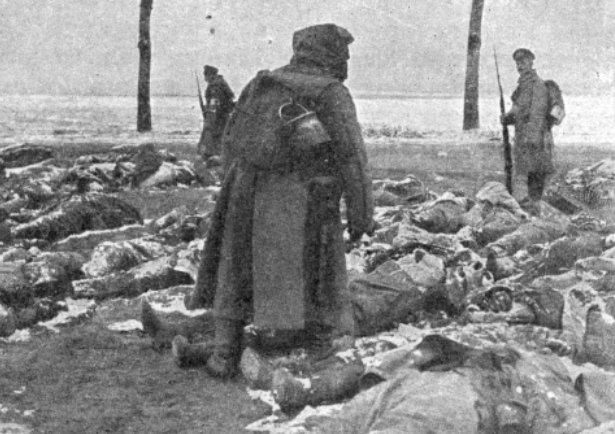
Russian soldiers clean up the corpses of German soldiers in East Prussia

Pursuing the goal of attracting as many Russian troops as possible, the commander of the 8th Army, Schubert, ordered the I Corps to advance to the Neman River, cross it between the fortresses of Kovno and Olita and destroy the Białystok–Warsaw highway. However, at the same time, the Russians began an offensive to bypass the right flank of the German I Corps, so the headquarters of the German 8th Army ordered the withdrawal of troops from the bend of the Neman River to Suwalki in the afternoon of September 26. By September 30, almost the entire Russian 1st and 10th Armies went on the offensive with the forces of the 3rd, 20th, 22nd, 26th Army Corps. By September 30, Schubert concentrated 4 German infantry divisions near Augustow and Suwalki, intending to give a decisive battle to the main forces of the 1st and 10th Armies.

Events began to develop most dramatically in the area of Augustow and Suwalki. Intending to invade East Prussia in the area of the city of Luk, south of the line of the Masurian Lakes, cutting the German 8th Army in two, N. Ruzsky sent troops of the 10th Army, 3 corps: 22nd, 2nd Caucasian and the 3rd Siberian Army Corps to Augustow. Soon, the 26th Army Corps and three cavalry divisions of the 1st Army were ordered to support the 10th Army's advance on Augustow, while 2 cavalry divisions and the newly formed 1st Turkestan Army Corps were also to attack Augustow from the right flank.

The task of capturing Avtustov was entrusted to the 3rd Siberian Army Corps of Infantry General E. Radkevich (7th and 8th Siberian Rifle Divisions). The 3rd Siberian Army Corps went on the offensive on the morning of September 27, 1914. After a general attack by three rifle regiments, the Germans abandoned Augustow and retreated to Suwalki by noon. The city was occupied by the 25th and 26th Siberian Rifle Regiments. Continuing the offensive, on September 30, the 3rd Siberian Army Corps entered into battle with the German 3rd Reserve Division.

On October 1, four corps of the 10th Army launched an attack on Suwalki. The goal was to encircle the German troops and cut off their escape route to Marggrabowa. However, German troops repelled the offensive in stubborn battles. At the same time, the German 2nd Infantry Division boldly attacked the superior forces of the 3rd Siberian Corps. On October 1, N. Ruzsky ordered the commander of the 1st Army, P. von Rennenkampf, to continue the invasion of East Prussia. By October 3, the 1st Army had made little progress. But during the day, the difficult situation on the flank of the 10th Army became clear, and the 26th Army Corps, and then the 2nd Brigade of the 29th Infantry Division, were sent to help it. On the morning of October 4, the entire 20th Corps received the task of attacking in support of the 10th Army. As a result, the Germans could not withstand the onslaught of the Russians at Suvalki and began to retreat bearing catastrophic losses, as a participant in the battle recalled, "The losses of the Germans at Suvalki were so high that their entire retreat path was littered with corpses"

== Outcome ==
In general, until the end of September 1914, the Russian command of the armies of the North-Western Front was able to restore strength after the defeat near Tannenberg and Masurian Lakes, create a powerful grouping and threaten East Prussia, chaining significant forces of the German 8th Army to this area in October 1914 . The Germans had to leave the banks of the Neman, Augustów and Suwałki. Moreover, a new offensive was organized within Germany. However, the Russian troops failed to conquer the province: also using reinforcements, the German side was able not only to stop the troops of the 1st and 10th Armies, but also inflict serious defeats on the flank groups and go on the offensive, which lasted until November. However, the Russian troops had sufficient forces to repel frontal attacks and again force the Germans to withdraw to East Prussia.

In early November, the Russian armies maintained a numerical superiority, but the Germans's transition to new defensive tactics made it possible to release five infantry divisions for the operation against Łódź without prejudice to the defense of the province. Turning to the tactics of creating well-fortified zones, the German troops of the 8th Army by mid-November 1914 stopped the advance of the Russian 10th Army and forced it to also go on the defensive.

Although the Russians managed to fulfill their initial plan to push the enemy away from the Polish borders and create a springboard for an offensive deep into German territory, the Russian conquests were eliminated during the Second Battle of the Masurian Lakes.

== See also ==
- First Russian invasion of East Prussia
