= 1st Cavalry Corps (Russian Empire) =

- Country: Russian Empire
- Allegiance: Imperial Russian Army
- Engagements: World War I

The 1st Cavalry Corps was a cavalry corps in the Imperial Russian Army.

== Part of ==
- 12th Army: 1915
- 1st Army: 1915
- 2nd Army: 1915
- 1st Army: 1915–1916
- 5th Army: 1916–1917

== Commanders ==
- Lieutenant General A. V. Novikov: 1914–1915
- General V. A. Oranovsky: 1915–1917
- Lieutenant General książę A. N. Dolgorukov: 1917
- Lieutenant General M. A. Svieczin: 1917
