= 37th Army Corps =

- Country: Russian Empire
- Allegiance: Imperial Russian Army

The 37th Army Corps was an Army corps in the Imperial Russian Army.

== Part of ==
- 12th Army: 1915 – 1916
- 1st Army: 1916 – 1917
- 5th Army: 1917
