= 12th Army (Russian Empire) =

World War I Russian field Army

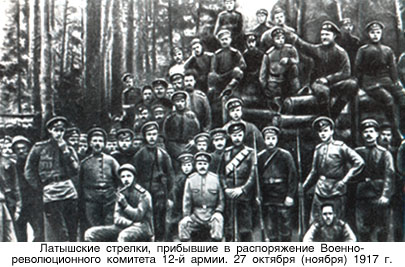

The 12th Army was a field army of the Imperial Russian Army during World War I that fought on the Eastern Front.

The army was formed from reconstituted units of the 2nd Army that was virtually destroyed in the Battle of Tannenberg and corps taken from the 1st and 10th Armies.

Its field headquarters was established in January 1915.In August 1915, the entire staff of the 12th Army was replaced by that of the 13th Army, which itself ceased to exist. The unit was assigned to the Northwestern Front and later to the Northern Front, being disbanded by the end of 1917.

== Commanders ==
No.	Portrait	Commander	Took office	Left office	Time in office
1	Paul von Plehwe	General of Cavalry; Paul von Plehwe (1850–1916)	14 January 1915	8 June 1915	145 days
2	Aleksey Churin [ru]	General of Infantry; Aleksey Churin (1852–1916)	8 June 1915	20 August 1915	73 days
3	Vladimir Gorbatovsky	General of Infantry; Vladimir Gorbatovsky (1851–1924)	20 August 1915	20 March 1916	213 days
4	Radko Dimitriev	General of Infantry; Radko Dimitriev (1859–1918)	20 March 1916	20 July 1917	1 year, 122 days
5	Dmitri Parsky	Lieutenant-General; Dmitri Parsky (1866–1921)	20 July 1917	9 September 1917	51 days
6	Yakov Yusefovich [ru]	Lieutenant-General; Yakov Yusefovich (1872–1929)	9 September 1917	14 November 1917	71 days
7	Vasily Fedorovich Novitsky	Lieutenant-General; Vasily Fedorovich Novitsky (1869–1929)	14 November 1917	22 November 1917	8 days
8	David Guntsadze [ru]	Lieutenant-General; David Guntsadze (1861–1925)	22 November 1917	29 December 1917	37 days

From 29 December 1917 to April 1918, the 12th Army was nominally commanded by a board of:

- D. K. Guntsadze
- S. M. Nakhimson
- M. G. Trakman

== Organisation ==
At the end of the war, the field army included:

- Field Staff
- 13th Army Corps
- 43rd Army Corps
- 49th Army Corps
- 2nd Siberian Army Corps
- 6th Siberian Army Corps
- 12th Army mobile air base

== See also ==
- List of Russian armies in World War I
- List of Imperial Russian Army formations and units
