= Battle of Augustów (1914) =

First World War battle between the Russian Empire and the German Empire

- Part of Eastern Front of World War I
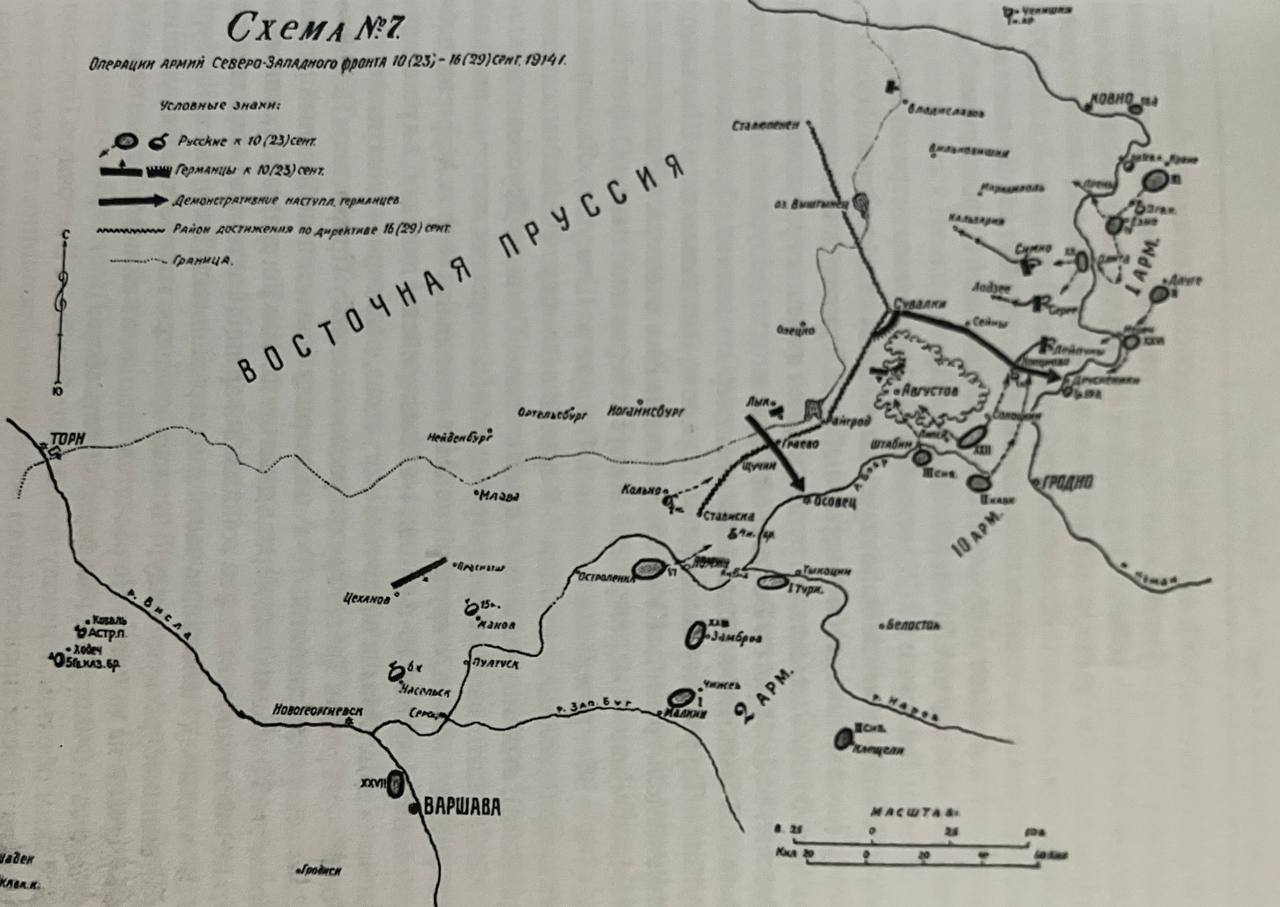
- Operations of the Northwestern front on the border of East Prussia around the towns of Augustow and Suwalki
Date	12–30 September 1914
Location	Augustów, Russian Poland (present-day Poland)
Territorial changes	Russia captures Stalluplen, Gołdap, Lykov and Byaluyu

Belligerents
Russian Empire	German Empire

Commanders and leaders
Evgeny Radkevich; Vasily Flug	(German Empire) Paul von Hindenburg (German Empire) Richard von Schubert

Units involved
10th Army	(German Empire) 8th Army

Strength
247,467	129,814

Casualties and losses
20,000	

The Battle of Augustów, also known as the First Augustow Operation, was a conflict on the Eastern Front during the First World War. It took place between the Russian Empire and the German Empire in September 1914.

== Prelude ==
Following the retreat of the Russian 2nd Army after the Battle of Tannenberg, Russian forces found themselves defending the perimeter of Augustów. The 10th Army established positions along the banks of the Neman river. Due to the outbreak of the battle for Warsaw, the command of the Northwestern Front decided to conduct an operation to secure the rear of the main army.

The Russians brought in reserves from the 10th Army, consisting of 9 infantry divisions and 1.5 cavalry divisions. They faced General Schubert's 8th Army, which included 7 infantry divisions, 1 cavalry division, and Landwehr units. Overall, the forces were roughly equal in size.

== Battle ==
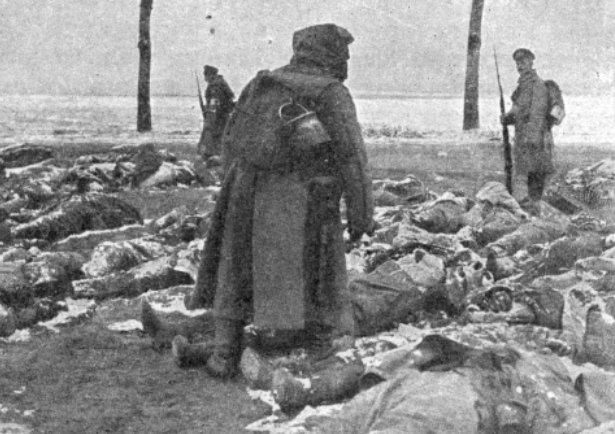
Russian soldiers clean up the corpses of German soldiers in East Prussia

Fighting erupted against the German 8th Army on 12 September as German forces attempted to capture the Osowiec fortress, while other units launched attacks on Druskininkai. The fighting lasted for three days and yielded no significant benefits for the Germans. Meanwhile, the Russians capitalized on their defensive success and launched a counteroffensive on 15 September.

German units attempting to ford the Neman River were overwhelmed, and the battle moved into the Augustów forests. The German units were partially blocked, and the 3rd Siberian Corps advanced to their rear, where the Germans suffered significant losses, with some forces being defeated and others captured. On 18 September, a counter bayonet battle took place, during which Russian General Stelnitsky personally led the infantry into action, achieving complete success. Subsequent fighting was limited to German attempts to cross the Neman, which ended in complete failure, and artillery duels, in which the Russians emerged victorious.

General Flug corroborated these accounts, stating that German losses were at least as great as those of the Russians. The Russians captured significant trophies, including 22 guns, several dozen ammunition boxes, a few vehicles, and 3,000 German prisoners. This victory allowed the Russians to recover from their earlier setbacks at the start of the war. The situation had dramatically reversed: the Russian 10th Army completely defeated the German 8th Army and advanced into East Prussia, occupying several key cities.

== Sources ==
- Oleynikov, Alexei (2016). Россия-щит Антанты [Russia-Shield of Entente]. Foreword by Nikolai Starikov. St.Petersburg: Piter. ISBN 978-5-496-01795-4.
- 10-я армия в сентябре 1914 г. // Военный сборник — Кн. V. — Белград, 1924. — С. 232—260;
- Miltatuli, Pyotr (2017). Россия в эпоху царствование Николая 2 [Russia in the reign of Nicholas 2] (in Russian). Volume 2. Moscow: Русский издательский центр имени святого Василия Великого.
- Nelipovich, Sergei G. (2023). Два похода. Борьба за Восточную Пруссию в августе-октябре 1914 [Two campaigns. The Struggle for East Prussia in August-October 1914]. Забытые войны России (in Russian). Moscow: Квадрига. ISBN 978-5-91791-376-6.
