= 31st Army Corps (Russian Empire) =

- Country: Russian Empire
- Allegiance: Imperial Russian Army
- Engagements: World War I

The 31st Army Corps was an Army corps in the Imperial Russian Army.

== Part of ==
- 4th Army: 1914–1915
- 13th Army: 1915
- 3rd Army: 1915–1916
- Russian Special Army: 1916
