= 44th Army Corps (Russian Empire) =

- Country: Russian Empire
- Allegiance: Imperial Russian Army
- Engagements: World War I

The 44th Army Corps was an Army corps in the Imperial Russian Army.

== Part of ==
- 10th Army: 1915–1916
- 4th Army: 1916–1917
- 7th Army: 1917
- Russian Special Army: 1917
