= 48th Army Corps (Russian Empire) =

- Country: Russian Empire
- Allegiance: Imperial Russian Army
- Engagements: World War I

The 48th Army Corps was an Army corps in the Imperial Russian Army.

== Part of ==
- 9th Army: 1916-1917
