= Thadeus von Sivers =

Baltic German general

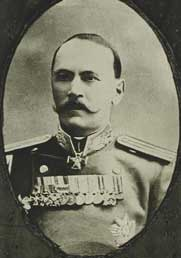
- General of the Infantry Thadeus von Sivers, c. 1914.
- Born: 16 October [O.S. 4 October] 1853; Warsaw, Congress Poland, Russian Empire
- Died: unknown
- Military career
- Allegiance: Russian Empire
- Branch: Imperial Russian Army
- Service years: 1871 – 1915
- Rank: General of the Infantry
- Commands: 16th Mingelian Grenadier Regiment; 27th Infantry Division; 16th Army Corps; 10th Army Corps; 10th Army; 20th Army Corps
- Conflicts: Russo-Turkish War; Boxer Rebellion; World War I; Battle of Stallupönen; Second Battle of the Masurian Lakes

Thadeus Ferdinand Ludwig von Sivers (Russian: Фадде́й Васи́льевич Си́верс, tr. Faddey Vasil'evich Sivers; 16 October [O.S. 4 October] 1853 – ?), always falsely referred to as Thadeus von Sievers, was a Baltic German general who served in the Imperial Russian Army.

Sievers was most notable for his role in the Invasion of East Prussia during the initial stage of World War I, in which he commanded the 10th Army against the Germans and succeeded in taking the East Prussian towns of Stallupönen (now Nesterov, Russia) and Goldap (now Poland) in October 1914.

Further major successes for the Russian Army in East Prussia failed to materialize. In the Second Battle of the Masurian Lakes in February 1915, the 10th Army commanded by Sivers, was largely destroyed. After the defeat, Sivers was ousted as Commander of the Army, even though he had been among those who had been warned beforehand of the unfavorable strategic situation that had arisen.

On 25 April 1915, Sievers was sent into retirement. His further fate was unknown, some speculate he fell into depression and committed suicide, while other claimed he survived into the Russian Civil War and took command on the White Movement's side.

== Additional reading ==
- Transehe-Roseneck, Astaf von. Genealogical Handbook of the Livonian Knighthood, Vol. 1. Görlitz (1929)
- Klingspor, Carl Arvid. Baltic heraldic coat of arms all, belonging to the knighthoods of Livonia, Estonia, Courland and Oesel noble families. Stockholm (1882)
