= 72nd Infantry Division (Russian Empire) =

- 72-я пехотная дивизия
- Active: 1904–1905; 1914–1918
- Country: Russian Empire
- Branch: Russian Imperial Army
- Type: Reserve
- Role: Infantry
- Engagements: Russo-Japanese War; World War I

The 72nd Infantry Division (Russian: 72-я пехотная дивизия, 72-ya Pekhotnaya Diviziya) was an infantry formation of the Russian Imperial Army. It was mobilized twice, in 1904–1905 for the Russo-Japanese War and in 1914–1918 for World War I.

== Organization ==
- 1st Brigade
  - 285th Infantry Regiment
  - 286th Infantry Regiment
- 2nd Brigade
  - 287th Infantry Regiment
  - 288th Infantry Regiment
