= 51st Infantry Division (Russian Empire) =

- 51-я пехотная дивизия
- Active: 1914–1918
- Country: Russian Empire
- Branch: Russian Imperial Army
- Role: Infantry

The 51st Infantry Division (Russian: 51-я пехотная дивизия, 51-ya Pekhotnaya Diviziya) was an infantry formation of the Russian Imperial Army.

== Organization ==
- 1st Brigade
  - 201st Infantry Regiment
  - 202nd Infantry Regiment
- 2nd Brigade
  - 203rd Infantry Regiment
  - 204th Infantry Regiment
- 51st Artillery Brigade
