= 43rd Army Corps (Russian Empire) =

- Country: Russian Empire
- Allegiance: Imperial Russian Army
- Engagements: World War I

The 43rd Army Corps was an Army corps in the Imperial Russian Army.

== Part of ==
- 6th Army: 1915
- 12th Army: 1915 - 1916
- 12th Army: 1917
