= 36th Army Corps (Russian Empire) =

- Country: Russian Empire
- Allegiance: Imperial Russian Army
- Engagements: World War I

The 36th Army Corps was an Army corps in the Imperial Russian Army.

== Part of ==
- 2nd Army: 1915
- 1st Army: 1915
- 2nd Army: 1915 - 1916
- 10th Army: 1916
- 9th Army: 1916 - 1917
- 4th Army: 1917
