= Russian invasion of East Prussia (1914) =

Military operation in the First World War

East Prussian campaign
- Part of the Eastern Front of World War I
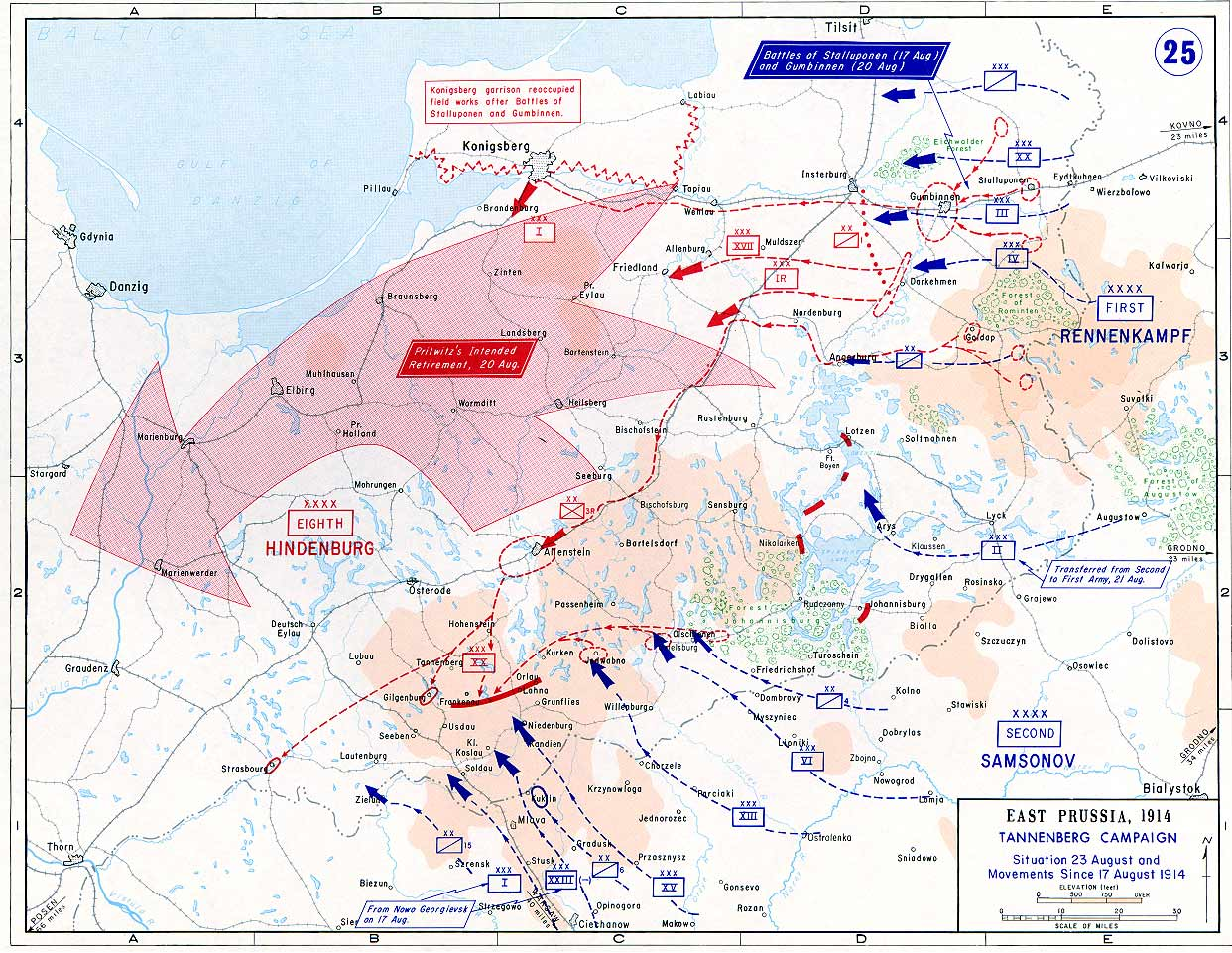
- Eastern Front, 17–23 August 1914.
Date	17 August – 14 September 1914
Location	East Prussia, German Empire
Result	German victory
Territorial changes	Germany recaptures all of East Prussia; Germany captures land in Poland

Belligerents
German Empire	Russian Empire

Commanders and leaders
(German Empire) Paul von Hindenburg (German Empire) Erich Ludendorff (German Empire) Max Hoffmann (German Empire) Maximilian von Prittwitz	(Russian Empire) Grand Duke Nicholas Nikolaevich (Russian Empire) Yakov Zhilinsky (Russian Empire) Paul von Rennenkampf (Russian Empire) Alexander Samsonov † (Russian Empire) Vasily Flug

Units involved
(German Empire) 8th Army	(Russian Empire) 1st Army (Russian Empire) 2nd Army (Russian Empire) 10th Army

Strength
Initial (including reserves): 209,522 men Later from Western Front: 46,866 men Total: 256,388 men	Initial (including reserves): 1st Army: 222,053 men 2nd Army: 280,902 men Later: 10th Army: 247,467 men Total: 750,422 men

Casualties and losses
Official German medical reports: 13,206 KIA, 26,722 WIA, 2,702 MIA; Total 42,630; Lost: 17 guns 17 machine guns 3 airplanes Other estimates: Stallupönen – 1,300; Gumbinnen – 14,600; Tannenberg – 12,000; Masurian lakes – 10,000 or 40,000; Total: 37,000–100,000	Official Russian medical reports: 24,589 KIA, 48,204 WIA, 167,533 MIA; Total 240,326; Lost: 462 guns 352 machine guns 10 airplanes Other estimates: Stallupönen – 7,500; Gumbinnen – 19,000; Tannenberg – 122,000–170,000; Masurian lakes – 125,000; Total: 270,000–320,000; 100,000 taken prisoner

The Russian invasion of East Prussia occurred during World War I, lasting from August to September 1914. As well as being the natural course for the Russian Empire to take upon the declaration of war on the German Empire, it was also an attempt to focus the Imperial German Army on the Eastern Front, as opposed to the Western Front as part of the alliance and to force Germany to fight a two front war. Despite superiority over the Germans in numbers, the invading Imperial Russian Army spread its forces thin and was defeated in the battles of Tannenberg and the Masurian Lakes, resulting in a complete strategic collapse of the Russian plan of war. The Germans also seemed to have weak cooperation among the troops and disagreements in the generals. The victory in East Prussia inspired too much self-confidence, which led to defeats at Warsaw and Lodz.

The shock of the invasion served to assist the German war effort. According to Alexander Watson "Outrage at the violation of national territory and Tsarist atrocities strengthened German solidarity, cemented conviction in the righteousness of the national cause, and acted as a terrible and lasting warning of the penalties of defeat".

== German planning ==
German strategy regarding Russia was defensive from 1888 onward, when the Chief of the German General Staff, Helmuth von Moltke, abandoned the concept of a decisive offensive into Russian territory and began to consider defensive options. According to German intelligence estimates, the railway network in Poland limited the Russians to three options: a purely defensive posture against Germany, an offensive down the Vistula straight towards Berlin or an invasion of East Prussia with two armies, one from the Narew and one from the Neman. French political pressure blocked the first option, while the second option was militarily unsound, leaving the third option as the most likely Russian course of action.

In 1894 Alfred von Schlieffen, then Chief of the German General Staff, war-gamed a scenario that corresponded to the Battle of Tannenberg in 1914. With the Russian Niemen army having overrun half of East Prussia, the German commander in the exercise exploited the separation between the Russian Narew and Niemen armies to mass his troops against the right flank of the Narew army and destroy the whole force. In the exercise critique Schlieffen said the Germans could easily just establish a defensive line behind the Vistula, but when the opportunity to destroy an entire Russian army was available, it should be taken.

Whereas Schlieffen's predecessor's Alfred von Waldersee's idea had been to launch a spoiling attack on the Russians as they deployed and then wait for reinforcements from the west, Schlieffen foresaw a mobile operation on interior lines using railways to mass forces against one Russian army and destroy it before it could retreat. As a result, every German general staff officer in East Prussia in 1914 knew how to respond to the Russian offensive.

== Russian planning ==
Grand Duke Nicholas, who had been appointed by Emperor Nicholas II as supreme commander of the Russian Army, fully supported going to war with Germany, especially after German troops occupied the town of Kalisz in Russian territory and committed atrocities there. He was an admirer of France and also understood the need for Russia to assist France's efforts on the Western Front. He told the French ambassador that Russia would invade East Prussia quickly to draw Germany's attention away from France. Grand Duke Nicholas and the high command were optimistic, planning to split Russia's forces between East Prussia in the north and Galicia in the south, securing the Polish salient if they were successful, before then pushing from central Poland towards Berlin. But the necessity of helping France also meant that the two Russian armies advancing into East Prussia did so before their mobilization was complete.

== Comparison of strength ==
The invasion was led by two Russian armies: the 1st Army, which was commanded by General Paul von Rennenkampf and consisted of 6.5 infantry divisions, 5.5 cavalry divisions, 472 guns, 254 machine guns (later 7 new reserve divisions arrived) and the 2nd Army under the command of General Alexander Samsonov, composed of 11 infantry divisions, 3 cavalry divisions, 724 guns, 434 machine guns. They were confronted by the German 8th Army, commanded by General Maximilian von Prittwitz and consisting of 14.5 infantry divisions, 1 cavalry division, 774 guns, 396 machine guns. Each Russian division consisted of 16 battalions, while each German division had 12. Russian and German battalions also differed in the number of personnel and weapons.

Although outnumbering the enemy, the Imperial Russian Army had numerous problems that contributed to its defeat: Russia was not prepared for a large war at the time as it was in the midst of a rearmament programme, as was known to the Germans. Many soldiers were untrained, its transport service was largely ineffective due to a lack of railways from the Russian side of East Prussia. Moreover, the topography slowed down the movement of Russian troops and influenced its forces to be spread out over a large territory. These natural barriers and little coordination between the two Russian armies allowed the Germans to engage each army separately, like in the Battle of Tannenberg or the Battle of Stallupönen. Russian military intelligence was greatly inferior to that of the Germans due to lack of reconnaissance units. Most importantly, the Russians lacked heavy artillery guns—a problem which would plague the Russian Army for the rest of the war. The invasion was launched before full mobilization was complete to aid the French; The Russians promised the swift invasion should France face the main German force upon French request in 1912.

On the other hand, the German 8th Army also had numerous problems. Half of it consisted of newly drafted elderly reservists. The German Empire last participated in a war in 1871, and the Russian Empire in 1905. Therefore, the German military had no combat experience, while the Russians mostly did. This was especially true of officers and senior military leadership, Generals Samsonov and Rennenkampf participated in the Russo-Japanese War.

== Battle ==
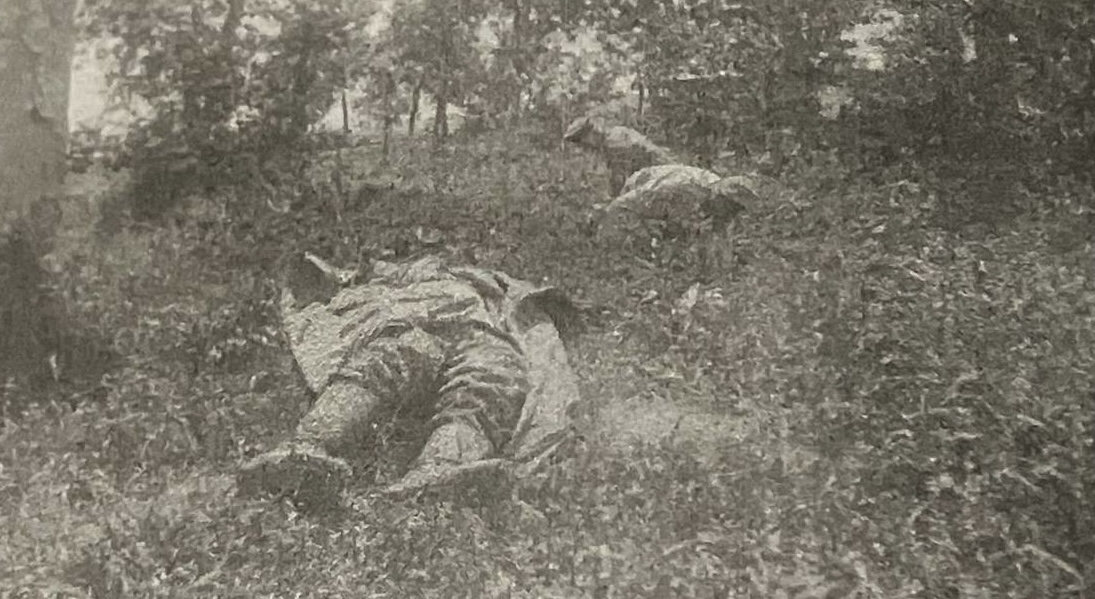
The first dead in the German army

However, quite quickly, Russia was able to mobilize an invasion into East Prussia. Any invasion of Prussia was an important blow to German morale as well as its general strategic situation. The German deployment on the outbreak of the war left only the 10 divisions of the German Eighth Army under General Maximilian von Prittwitz in East Prussia whereas the Russians had been able to mobilize the 1st Army, under General Paul von Rennenkampf and the 2nd Army, under General Alexander Samsonov. They entered East Prussia on 7–9 August.

The Battle of Stallupönen, fought between Russian and German forces on 17 August, was the opening engagement of World War I on the Eastern Front. It began in favor of the Germans, but after the arrival of Russian reserves, the Germans were forced to retreat.

The Battle of Gumbinnen, launched by the Germans on 20 August, was the first major offensive on the Eastern Front during the war. Owing to the hastiness of the German attack, the Russian army emerged victorious. The Germans retreated, possibly intending to conduct holding actions in Masuria or even withdraw to the Vistula River, which would have meant abandoning the salient of East Prussia. This would have aligned with pre-war German contingency plans, which anticipated such a withdrawal if the Russians offered stronger resistance than expected.

Despite any earlier preparations, the Germans could not allow the Prussian capital, Königsberg, to fall into Russian hands. The moral, symbolic, and military importance of the city being a major logistical hub made its loss potentially disastrous both strategically and domestically. It was also likely that Russian forces, capitalizing on such an advantage, would have used their numerical superiority to overwhelm the remaining German defenses. In short, the Germans had to counterattack immediately and drive the Russians from East Prussia.

The Russian supply situation was abysmal. Short of food and artillery ammunition and incorrectly believing the Germans were in full retreat, Rennenkampf did not pursue, refitted for a couple days, and lost contact. Instead of sticking to the plan and advancing south-westerly to link up with Samsonov, he instead slowly moved his 1st Army westerly. Under pressure to advance and cut off the supposed German retreat, Samsonov's 2nd Army outdistanced their supplies resulting in hungry demoralized troops.

Prittwitz panicked when the Russian onslaught entered East Prussia and believed his army would be crushed between the pincers of the two Russian armies (as was the Russian plan). He announced his intention of abandoning East Prussia and move behind the Vistula. Helmuth von Moltke the Younger, Chief of the German General Staff from 1906 to 1914 replaced Prittwitz with Paul von Hindenburg (brought out of retirement) on 22 August. Hindenburg, along with his chief of staff, the formidable Ludendorff, would approach the crisis in East Prussia very differently. In contrast to Prittwitz, Hindenburg and Ludendorff decided to take the offensive and encircle Samsonov. Following the plans of Colonel Max Hoffmann, Prittwitz's deputy chief of operations, they chose to wheel eight of their divisions counter-clockwise to attack Samsonov; taking advantage of interior lines and well-practiced ability to move quickly via the rail roads. In the Battle of Tannenberg, the casualties of the Russian 2nd Army amounted to 120,219 KIA, WIA, MIA, while the German 8th Army had only 13,058 casualties. The 2nd Army was destroyed and Samsonov shot himself. The Germans then forced the 1st and 10th Armies to retreat out of East Prussia in the Battle of the Masurian Lakes.

The invasion was a ghastly failure for the Russians, a setback which was followed by considerable German advances in the following year, including the capture of the Polish city of Warsaw. However, the crisis caused in the German High Command by the unexpected Russian advance forced the sending of 2 corps and a cavalry division from the Western Front as part of the new 9th Army in order to support the attack on the Russians. These additional forces did not arrive in time for the twin battles as Ludendorff predicted and, had they entered France as originally planned, could have been tremendously helpful to the precarious situation in the West. In the head of French military intelligence Colonel Charles Dupont's words, "their debacle was one of the elements of our victory."

== Casualties and losses ==
According to the regimental lists of casualties and information from reports and logs of military operations, as well as information submitted later from the remnants of the formations that were surrounded, the units that were part of the Russian 2nd Army lost 220 officers and 5,302 soldiers killed before September 1914 (these are those who was taken out of the battlefield and buried by the Russian side), 542 officers and 11,784 soldiers were wounded (evacuated to Russia or admitted to field hospitals), missing (excluding two encircled corps)—391 officers and 29,491 soldiers. In addition, according to reports from part of the encircled formations, the casualties in the Russian 13th and 15th Army Corps on October 1 (by this time those who had fallen behind or escaped from the encirclement had practically ceased to return) amounted to 1,552 officers (of which, according to available information, 111 were killed, 143 wounded and 907 were missing or captured, there is no data on the rest, especially for those called up from the reserve) and 76,472 soldiers (of which 3,130 were killed, 2,412 were wounded, 44,646 were missing, there is no data on the rest, especially for those called up from the reserve). In the 15th Army Corps, for example, according to later reports, 2,978 were killed and 25,000 men were taken prisoner. In total, the damage of the 2nd Army, according to all surviving lists and reports, can be estimated at 2,451 officers and 117,768 soldiers.

Thus, together with the current figure of the corpses of Russian soldiers buried by the German side (6,789), the 2nd Army lost 13,590 killed. However, some of the dead could remain unburied. The number of wounded was probably higher, but it is rather difficult to take them into account: in a number of cases they were captured and are counted among the prisoners. In August 1914, 543 seriously wounded Russian soldiers entered the German hospitals, 8 of them died. The total number of prisoners of the 2nd Army announced by the Germans was 15 generals, 1,830 officers, 91,400 soldiers. So, out of the number of officers, 220 died, 542 were wounded and evacuated, 1,830 were captured. Of the soldiers of the 2nd Army, 13,370 definitely died, at least 11,784 were wounded and evacuated, 91,400 were captured; the fate of another 1,214 remains unknown (perhaps they deserted, and in part they could die from disease and hunger, hiding in the forests, or they could be among the wounded who were not included in the surviving lists).

For the entire East Prussian campaign, according to the lists of regiments and reports of the heads of divisions and brigades 1st Army, 275 officers and 9,347 soldiers were killed, 557 officers and 25,616 soldiers were wounded, 449 officers and 65,608 soldiers were missing, in total—1,826 officers and 115,374 soldiers (including without indication casualty categories—545 officers and 14,219 soldiers of the 54th and 72nd Infantry Divisions). The casualties of the 10th Army (led by Vasily Flug) amounted to more than 3,000 men: 12 officers and 437 soldiers were killed, 54 officers and 1,788 soldiers were wounded, 13 officers and 1,416 soldiers were missing, a total of 79 officers and 3,557 soldiers.

The German troops of the 8th Army in two months of fighting lost, according to sanitary reports, 3,867 dead (of which 247 officers), 7,053 missing (of which 39 officers), 21,987 wounded (a total of 32,907 combat casualties) and 23,168 patients, of which during the same time 20,415 men were returned to service. Before the publication of the sanitary report, German researchers determined the casualties of the 8th Army in August 1914 as follows: 239 officers and 2902 soldiers were killed, 583 officers and 12,410 soldiers were wounded, 43 officers and 11,488 soldiers were missing, and in the First Battle of the Masurian Lakes was estimated at 9,000 men. In addition, the authors also mentioned casualties without categories - 800 men from the 3rd Reserve Division and 543 men from the 6th and 70th Landwehr Infantry Brigades.

The incompleteness of this information can also be overcome by using published nominal lists of casualties as a source. An analysis of these lists for August 1914 - December 1916 gives the following figures: 409 officers and 6,647 soldiers were killed, 833 officers and 25,889 soldiers were wounded, 61 officers and 8,791 soldiers were missing and captured. In this case, this is the full composition of all the fighting units, including landstorm battalions serving in headquarters, sappers (pioneers), heavy artillery, medics, signalmen, pilots (15 men) and sailors of the river flotilla (two). Some discrepancy downwards in the number of those killed with the data of regimental histories is explained by the fact that their authors included those who died in captivity during the entire war and died from diseases among the dead.

The Russian 2nd Army took 55 soldiers prisoner in East Prussia and took them to Russia (the rest fled or were repulsed during the fighting), the 1st and 10th armies - 38 officers and 2,990 soldiers (of which 29 officers and 1,377 soldiers wounded, and so badly that 381 of them died before being sent to the camps). Given this information, the number of dead German soldiers may increase to almost 13,000 men (including 432 officers), and the number of missing people will decrease to the number of surviving prisoners (2,702 men). In any case, the combat casualties of the German troops in East Prussia reach 42,630 men, of which 1,303 are officers, which was 6 times less than the damage of the Russian armies operating against them.

In 2020, based on information from the Russian military archives, Sergey Nelipovich published the book "Two Campaigns. Struggle for East Prussia" (in Russian) with the casualties of the Russian army in East Prussia in 1914. Nelipovich took information on German casualties from the official German medical reports with lists of casualties by name.

East Prussia (17 August – 14 September 1914)	KIA			WIA			MIA		
East Prussia (17 August – 14 September 1914)	Russians	Ratio	Germans	Russians	Ratio	Germans	Russians	Ratio	Germans
Combat casualties	24,589	1.8:1	13,206	48,204	1.8:1	26,722	167,533	62:1	2,702

== Gallery ==
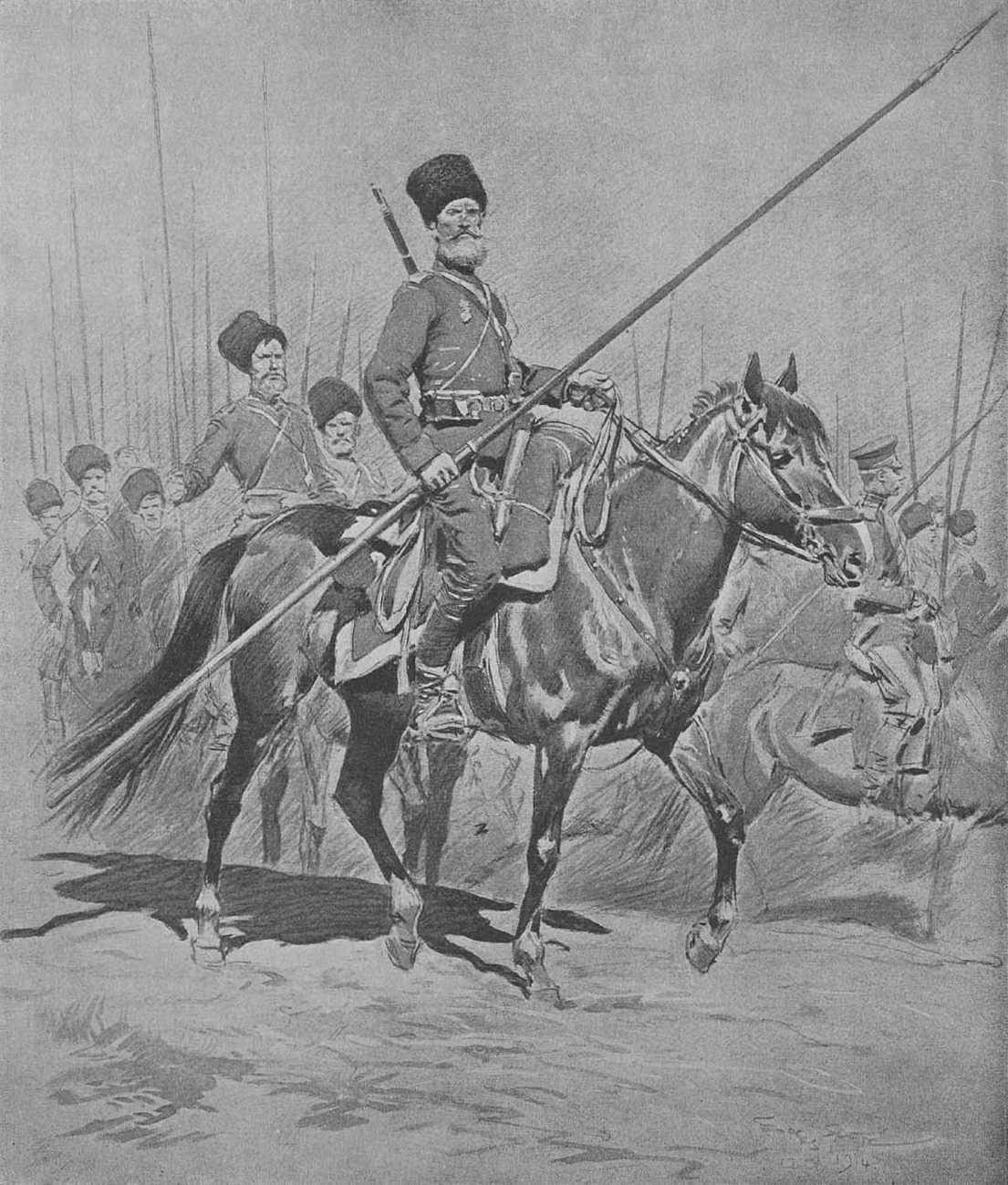
"To Prussia!", a drawing by Georges Scott for L'Illustration of 29 August 1914: "On the road to Berlin. The invasion of East Prussia by the Cossack avant-garde preceded the bulk of the Russian army."

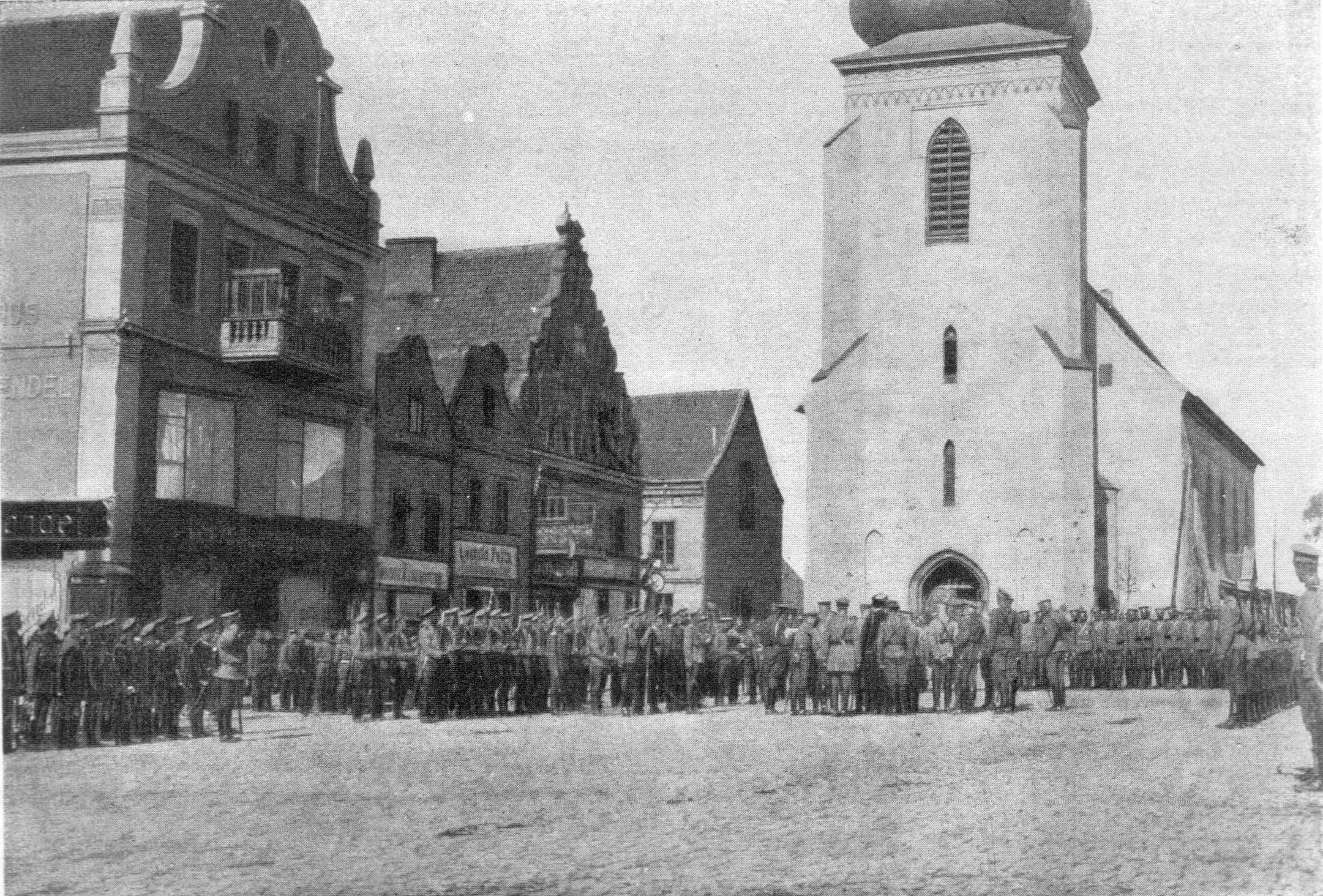
The Chevalier Guard Regiment and the Life Guard Horse Regiment of the Russian Imperial Guard in Insterburg, East Prussia. (Note: Present-day Chernyakhovsk, Kaliningrad Oblast.) The town was under Russian occupation from 24 August – 11 September 1914.

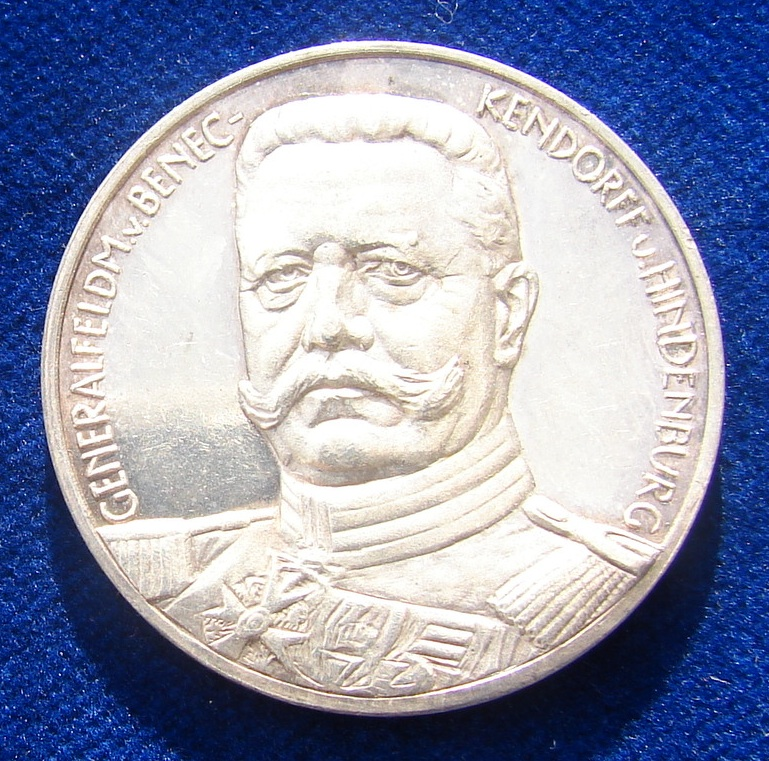
Obverse of a German silver medal commemorating the liberation of East Prussia in 1914 by Paul von Hindenburg.

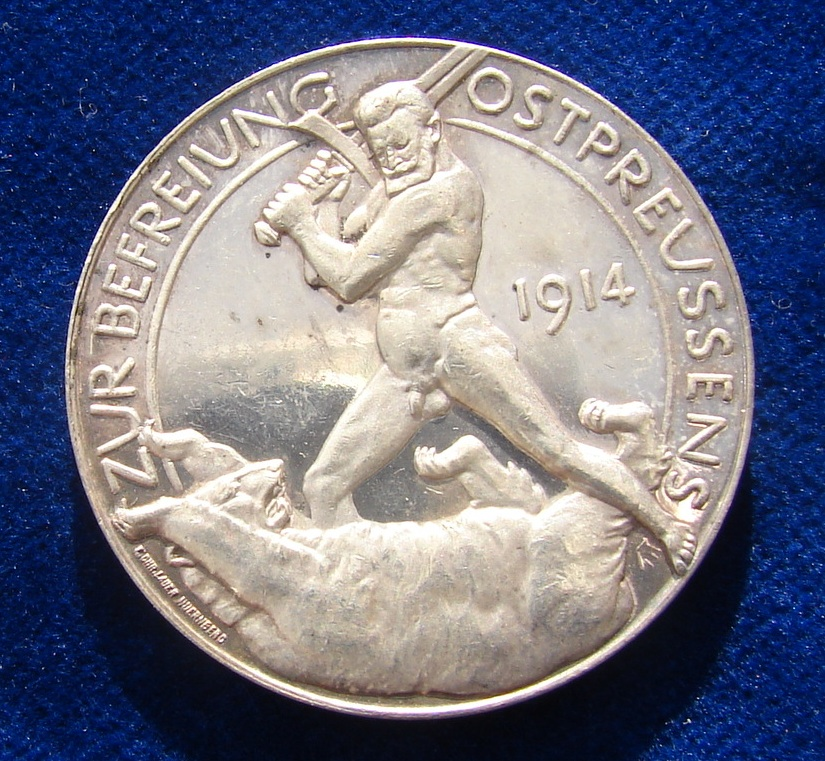
Reverse of a German silver medal commemorating the liberation of East Prussia in 1914 by Paul von Hindenburg. The naked General Hindenburg is fighting the Russian Bear with his sword.

== See also ==
- Second Russian invasion of East Prussia (1914)
- Battle of Augustów (1914)

== Bibliography ==
- Borisyuk, Andrey (2024). Забытая война. Россия в 1914-1918 [The forgotten war. Russia in 1914-1918] (in Russian). Moscow: Вече. ISBN 978-5-4484-5078-5.
- Nelipovich, Sergei G. (2023). Два похода. Борьба за Восточную Пруссию в августе-октябре 1914 [Two campaigns. The Struggle for East Prussia in August-October 1914]. Забытые войны России (in Russian). Moscow: Квадрига. ISBN 978-5-91791-376-6.
- Nelipovich, Sergei (2017). Русский фронт Первой Мировой войны: потери сторон 1914 [The Russian Front of the First World War: the losses of the sides in 1914]. Moscow: Квадрига. ISBN 978-5-91791-238-7.
- Oleynikov, Alexei (2016). Россия-щит Антанты [Russia-Shield of Entente]. Foreword by Nikolai Starikov. St.Petersburg: Piter. ISBN 978-5-496-01795-4.
- Robinson, Paul (2014). Grand Duke Nikolai Nikolaevich: Supreme Commander of the Russian Army. Cornell University Press. ISBN 978-1-5017-5709-9.
- Zuber, Terence (2002). Inventing the Schlieffen Plan: German War Planning 1871–1914. New York: Oxford University Press. ISBN 0-19-925016-2.
- Zuber, Terence (17 July 2006). "The German intelligence estimates in the west, 1885–1914". Intelligence and National Security. 21 (2): 177–201. doi:10.1080/02684520600619775. ISSN 1743-9019. S2CID 154431833.
