= Northwestern Front (Russian Empire) =

WW1 Russian formation (1914–1915)

The Northwestern Front (Russian: Се́веро-За́падный фронт) was an army group of the Imperial Russian Army during the First World War. It was established in August 1914 and existed for one year prior to being divided into the Northern Front and Western Front.

The armies subordinated to the Western Front took part in the Russian invasion of East Prussia at the beginning of the war.

== Commanders of the Northwestern Front ==
- 19.07.1914–03.09.1914 — General Yakov Zhilinskiy
- 03.09.1914–17.03.1915 — General Nikolai Ruzsky
- 17.03.1915–04.08.1915 — General Mikhail Alekseyev

== Armies deployed on the Northwestern Front ==
- 1st Army (July 1914 – August 1915)
- 2nd Army (July 1914 – August 1915)
- 3rd Army (June 1915 – August 1915)
- 4th Army (June 1915 – August 1915)
- 5th Army (September 1914 – August 1915)
- 10th Army (August 1914 – August 1915)
- 12th Army (January 1915 – August 1915)
- 13th Army (June 1915 – August 1915)

== See also ==
- List of Imperial Russian Army formations and units
