= 3rd Cavalry Division (Russian Empire) =

- 3-я кавалерийская дивизия
- Active: 1875–1918
- Country: Russian Empire
- Branch: Russian Imperial Army
- Role: Cavalry
- Engagements: World War I; Battle of Tannenberg

The 3rd Cavalry Division (Russian: 3-я кавалерийская дивизия, 3-ya Kavaleriiskaya Diviziya) was a cavalry formation of the Russian Imperial Army.

== Organization ==
- 1st Cavalry Brigade
  - 3rd Dragoon Regiment
  - 3rd Uhlan Regiment
- 2nd Cavalry Brigade
  - 3rd Hussar Regiment
  - 3rd Cossack Regiment
- 3rd Horse Artillery Battalion

== Commanders ==
- 1908–1912: Sergei Scheidemann
