= Vasily Flug =

Russian General of the Infantry (1860–1955)

Vasily Egorovich Flug
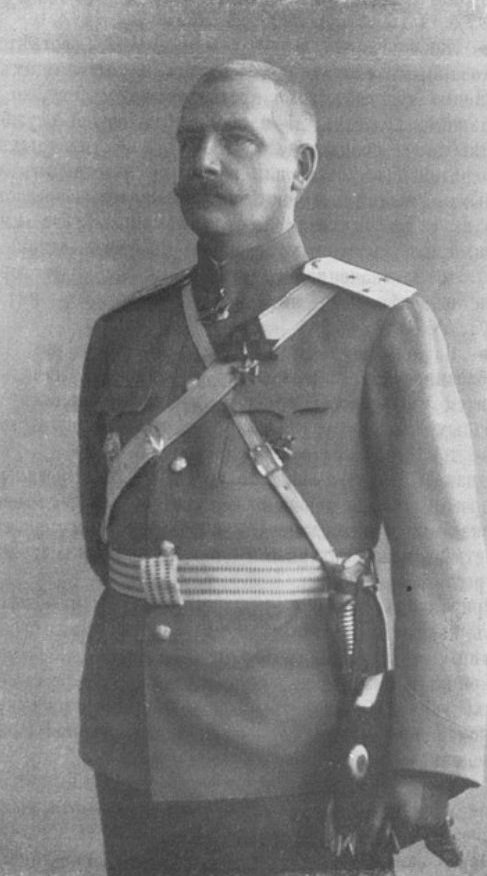
- Born: March 19, 1860
- Died: December 3, 1955 (aged 95) San Francisco, California, United States
- Allegiance: Russian Empire (Russia) White Movement; Nazi Germany
- Branch: (Russian Empire) Imperial Russian Army; Russian Corps
- Commands: 10th Army; 2nd Army Corps
- Conflicts: Boxer Rebellion; Russo-Japanese War; World War I Russian Civil War; Second World War

Vasily Egorovich Flug (Russian: Василий Егорович Флуг; March 19, 1860 – December 3, 1955) was an Imperial Russian Army General of the Infantry. A career military officer, he served in the Boxer Rebellion, Russo-Japanese War, and World War I, before joining the White movement during the Russian Civil War. Like many other officers, he went into exile after the end of the Russian Civil War, initially moving to Yugoslavia. After World War II, Flug went to the United States, where he died.

== Biography ==
Flug graduated from the 2nd Saint Petersburg Military Gymnasium in 1877 and the Mikhailovsky Artillery Academy in 1880 with the rank of second lieutenant, being first assigned to the 7th Horse Artillery Battery. Upon his graduation from the General Staff Academy in 1890, he was appointed head of the drilling staff department of the Vladivostok Fortress on November 26 of that year. From October 4, 1893, Flug served as a squadron commander in the 11th Kharkov Dragoon Regiment. He transferred to become a senior adjutant of the Caucasian Grenadier Division on October 6, 1894.

=== Far East service ===
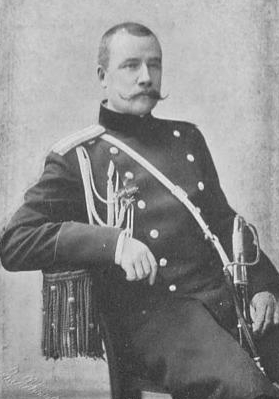
Flug as a Colonel in 1900

On February 16, 1896, Flug became a staff officer at the headquarters of the 2nd East Siberian Rifle Brigade, stationed in the Russian Far East. He participated in the Russian invasion of Manchuria during the Boxer Rebellion in 1900 and 1901. On July 22, 1900, he became head of the military staff department of the Kwantung Oblast. For his actions during the capture of Lutai on September 9, 1900, Flug was awarded the Gold Sword for Bravery on March 15, 1901. On January 22, 1902, he became chief of staff of the Kwangtung Oblast, and was promoted to major general on August 27, 1903, for distinguishing himself.

From 29 January 1904, Flug was quartermaster of the field headquarters of the governor in the Far East. He participated in the Russo-Japanese War. From 14 January 1905, Flug was the general quartermaster of the headquarters of the 2nd Manchurian Army. From 21 September 1905, he was the military governor of the Maritime Region and Ataman of the Ussuri Cossacks. A Lieutenant General in 1908, he became on 19 November 1909, the commander of the 37th Infantry Division and on 30 July 1912, of the 2nd Guards Infantry Division. From 12 January 1913, Flug was an assistant to the General Governor of Turkestan and commander of the Army of the Turkestan Military District.

=== World War I ===
After the destruction of General Samsonov's 2nd Army in the wake of the Battle of Tannenberg, the 10th Army was formed in late August 1914 from reserve units. On 29 August 1914, Vasily Flug was appointed commander of this 10th Army and made a General of the Infantry. Despite successful actions in the battles against the 8th German Army and the taking of Suwałki, and because of disagreements with General Nikolai Ruzsky, Vasily Flug was on 23 September 1914 suspended for "dangerous activities" by the command of the army and transferred to the supreme commander. On 4 October 1914, he was appointed to supervise the restoration of the 13th and 15th Army Corps, which had been all but destroyed in Eastern Prussia in August 1914. On 8 July 1915, he was appointed commander of the 2nd Army Corps. He was awarded the Order of St. George 4th degree.

During the Vilnius operation in September 1915, the Germans set out to disengage the troops of the Northern and Western fronts by hitting at the wedge between the 5th and 10th armies, and sending cavalry to the area of Molodechno to operate in the rear of the 10th Army. Part of the 2nd Corps under the general command of General Flug was ordered to counter the enemy's designs. Not only did he withheld the onslaught of the enemy, but he also moved to the offensive. As a result of the energy, courage and skillful leadership shown by General Flug, the German plan came to nothing.

In 1916, the 2nd Corps joined the 7th Army and participated in the South-Western Front offensive in the summer of 1916.

=== Revolution and Civil War ===
After the February Revolution, Flug was put on 30 May 1917 in the reserve of officers at the headquarters of the Petrograd Military District. After the October coup, he left for Don. On November 14, 1917, he arrived in Novocherkassk and offered his services to General Mikhail Alekseyev, who had formed the Volunteer Army.

In February 1918, Vasily Flug was sent to Siberia to organize the anti-Bolshevik resistance there. He left Novocherkassk on 25 February under the name of Vasily Fadeev. During his mission to Siberia, he helped unify and coordinate the activities of the clandestine officers' organizations in Omsk, Petropavlovsk, Tomsk and Irkutsk. On 29 March 1918, he arrived in Omsk, on 27 April, in Tomsk, on 4 May, in Irkutsk, and on 11 June in Vladivostok. Vasily Flug then travelled to Harbin, where he was a member of the Government of General Horvath from June 1918. On 1–14 December 1918, he temporarily served as commander of the troops in the Amur military region. As of 3 December 1918, he became an assistant High Commissioner in the Far East of General Horvath in the civil area.

At the very end of 1918, Flug arrived in Omsk, where he met Admiral Kolchak. Despite his extensive experience and involvement in the organization of the Anti-Bolshevik resistance in Siberia, there was no place for him in Kolchak's Army. On the instructions of Kolchak, he returned to southern Russia at the disposal of general Anton Denikin. On February 10, 1919, Vasily Flug sailed from Vladivostok on the steamboat Tomsk and on April 6, 1919, arrived in Novorossiysk.

After returning to Southern Russia, Flug was entrusted in May 1919 with carrying out an inspection of all logistical institutions under the authority of the Special Meeting. His main task was the expulsion from the excessively overgrown number of logistical offices compared to officers suitable for combat service. In September 1919, he was appointed an assistant to the military unit of the commander-in-chief and commander of the Kiev region, General Dragomirov. After the loss of Kiev, he retreated to the Crimea. On 8 December 1919 Flug was transferred to the reserve ranks at the headquarters of the Novorossiysk region.

=== In exile ===
In 1920, after the Crimea was abandoned by the White Russian troops, Flug left for Yugoslavia. From 1922 he served in the Yugoslav Military Ministry (Varaždin). He was actively involved in the activities of the Russian All-Military Union. In 1930, Flug became acting chief of the 4th Division of the Russian All-Military Union (Yugoslavia), and at the same time until March 1932, he served as chairman of the district government of the Russian staff officers in the 4th Division of the Russian All-Military Union.

During World War II, Flug served in the Russian Corps. After the war ended, he moved to the United States. He was a member of the Society of Great War veterans. He was a permanent employee of the magazine Watch and Bulletin of Military Knowledge. Flug died in San Francisco.

== Essays ==
- A mission report from the Volunteer Army to Siberia in 1918//Archives of the Russian Revolution. -Berlin, 1923. -T. 9. -c. 243–304;
- 10th Army in September 1914, military compendium-kn. V. Belgrade, 1924. -c. 232–260;
- New French Field Service Statutes/Military Knowledge Bulletin. -No. 1-4. 1931;

=== Unpublished memoirs ===
- From the Kvantuna class to the beginning of the Japanese War (1929, manuscript);
- The Japanese War of 1904–1905. (1930, manuscript);
- The Great War (1930, manuscript);
- Revolution and Civil War (1931, manuscript);
- After the Russo-Japanese War in the administrative post of 1905–1910. (1932, manuscript);
- In the Great War, chapter II of the Army Corps. 1915–1917. (1934, manuscript).

== Awards ==
Flug received the following awards and decorations:

- Order of Saint Anna, 3rd class (1896) and 1st class with Swords (1905)
- Order of the White Eagle with Swords (May 25, 1915)
- Order of Saint Stanislaus, 3rd class (1893), 2nd class (1900), and 1st class with Swords (1905)
- Order of Saint Vladimir, 4th class with Swords and Bow (1900), 3rd class with Swords (1905), and 2nd class (December 6, 1911)
- Gold Sword for Bravery (March 15, 1901)
- Order of St. George, 4th class (January 9, 1916)

== Sources ==
- Zaleski, Konstantin (2003). Кто был кто в Первой мировой войне [Who's who in World War I] (in Russian). Moscow: AST/Astrel. ISBN 5-17-019670-9.
- E. Wolves, N. D. Egorov, and B. Merchants. White generals of the Eastern front of the Civil War. M. Russian route, 2003.
- Rutych N. H. Biographical Directory of the highest ranks of the voluntary Army and the armed forces of southern Russia. M., 2002.
- A. Ganin. General Fluga's secret mission.
- Flug, Vasily E. On the Russian army in Great War website
  Military offices
  Preceded by Office created	Commander of the 10th Army; August 22 – September 23, 1914	Succeeded by Thadeus von Sievers
  Preceded by Alexey Churin	Commander of the 2nd Army Corps; June 8, 1915 – May 30, 1917	Succeeded by Konstantin Tikhonravov
