= 13th Army (Russian Empire) =

- Active: 1915
- Disbanded: August 1915
- Country: Russian Empire
- Branch: Imperial Russian Army
- Type: Field Army
- Engagements: World War I

Commanders
- Notable commanders: Vladimir Gorbatovsky

The 13th Army was a field army of the Imperial Russian Army during World War I.

The headquarters of the 13th Army was formed on 16 May 1915. The Army served as a link between the Northwestern and Southwestern fronts. When in August 1915, the North-Western Front was split into the Northern and Western Front, the 13th Army was disbanded. Its troops were incorporated into the 3rd Army and the staff took over command of the 12th Army.

The 13th Army fought in the Great Retreat.

== Commander ==
- 12.06.1915 – 20.08.1915 — General of Infantry Vladimir Gorbatovsky.

== See also ==
- List of Russian armies in World War I
- List of Imperial Russian Army formations and units
