= 3rd Siberian Army Corps =

- Country: Russian Empire
- Allegiance: Imperial Russian Army
- Engagements: Russo-Japanese War; World War I

The 3rd Siberian Army Corps was an Army corps in the Imperial Russian Army.

== Composition ==
1905:

- 4th Siberian Rifle Division
- 7th Siberian Rifle Division

1914:

- 7th Siberian Rifle Division
- 8th Siberian Rifle Division

== Part of ==
- 1st Manchurian Army: 1904-1906
- 10th Army: 1914 - 1916
- 4th Army: 1914
- 2nd Army: 1917
