= 2nd Army Corps (Russian Empire) =

- Active: 1813-1918
- Country: Russian Empire
- Branch: (Russian Empire) Imperial Russian Army
- Size: Up to 20,000
- HQ: Grodno
- Engagements: Russo-Turkish War (1877–78); World War I; Battle of Tannenberg; Battle of Łódź (1914)

The 2nd Army Corps (Russian: 2-й армейский корпус) was a formation in the Imperial Russian Army that was active during World War I. It was headquartered in Grodno prior to the outbreak of the war, and took part in the Battle of Tannenberg in August 1914.

== Composition ==
- 26th Infantry Division
- 43rd Infantry Division
- 2nd Cavalry Division

== Commanders ==
- 1907: Kyprian Kandratovich
- 1912-1914: Sergei Scheidemann
- 08.06.1915 — 30.05.1917 : Vasily Flug

== See also ==
- Imperial Russian Army formations and units (1914)
