= 1st Army (Russian Empire) =

Division of the Imperial Russian Army from 1914 to 1918

- Active: July 1914 – beginning of 1918
- Country: Russian Empire
- Branch: Imperial Russian Army
- Type: Field army
- Engagements: World War I; Eastern Front; Battle of Stallupönen; Battle of Gumbinnen; Battle of Tannenberg; First Battle of the Masurian Lakes; Battle of Łódź; Bug–Narew Offensive; Second battle of Przasnysz; Narew Offensive

Commanders
- Notable commanders: General Aleksei Brusilov; General Lavr Kornilov; General Paul von Rennenkampf

The 1st Army (Russian: 1-я армия, romanized: 1-ya armiya) was an army-level command of the Russian Imperial Army created during World War I. The First Army, commanded by General Paul von Rennenkampf, invaded East Prussia at the outbreak of war in 1914 along with the Second Army commanded by General Alexander Samsonov. After declaring war on the German Empire, the Russian Empire had been able to mobilize very quickly. All Russian forces were put under the command of Grand Duke Nikolai and his Quartermaster General Yuri Danilov.

The invading forces made a determined and speedy attack on East Prussia. However, the First and Second Armies were stopped by the German Eighth Army, led by Field Marshal Paul von Hindenburg and his chief of staff, General Erich Ludendorff. The German and Russian armies met at Tannenberg, where the Second Army was encircled and suffered complete destruction. Both the First and Second Armies suffered terrible casualties in one of the most comprehensive German victories of World War I. The First Army also suffered defeat at the First Battle of the Masurian Lakes in September 1914, which led to Rennenkampf's dismissal and replacement by Litvinov. First Army served under Northwestern front for the remainder of the war. Litvinov was replaced by Sokovnin in April 1917. Vannovski replaced Sokovnin in July and the army's final commander, von Notbek, took over in September 1917.

== Order of battle on formation ==
The First Army consisted of the following units in August 1914:

Organization of 1st Army in August 1914
Army	Corps	Division
1st Army	2nd Army Corps	26th Infantry Division
1st Army	2nd Army Corps	43rd Infantry Division
1st Army	3rd Army Corps	25th Infantry Division
1st Army	3rd Army Corps	27th Infantry Division
1st Army	4th Army Corps	30th Infantry Division
1st Army	4th Army Corps	40th Infantry Division
1st Army	20th Army Corps	28th Infantry Division
1st Army	20th Army Corps	29th Infantry Division
1st Army	(Unattached)	56th Infantry Division
1st Army	(Unattached)	1st Guards Cavalry Division
1st Army	(Unattached)	2nd Guards Cavalry Division
1st Army	(Unattached)	1st Cavalry Division
1st Army	(Unattached)	2nd Cavalry Division
1st Army	(Unattached)	3rd Cavalry Division

== Military Fronts in which the 1st Army participated ==
- Northwestern Front (July 1914 – August 1915)
- Western Front (August 1915 – April 1916)
- Northern Front (April 1916 – July 1917)
- Southwestern Front (July – September 1917)
- Northern Front (September 1917 – the beginning of 1918)

=== Engagements ===
- Battle of Stallupönen (17 August 1914)
- Battle of Gumbinnen (20 August 1914)
- Battle of Tannenberg (23–30 August 1914)
- First Battle of the Masurian Lakes (8–11 September 1914)
- Battle of Łódź (11 November – 6 December 1914)

== Commanders ==
The 1st Army had the following commanders until it was demobilized in 1918.

1st Army
From	Until	Rank	Name
19 July 1914	18 November 1914	General of the Cavalry	Paul von Rennenkampf
5 December 1914	2 April 1917	General of the Cavalry	Aleksandr Litvinov
12 April 1917	25 April 1917	Lieutenant General	Ilya Odishelizde
22 April 1917	30 July 1917	Lieutenant General	Mikhail Sokovin
31 July 1917	9 September 1917	Lieutenant General	Gleb Vannovsky
9 September 1917	November 1917	Lieutenant General	Vladimir von Notbek

== See also ==
- List of Imperial Russian Army formations and units
