= 2nd Manchurian Army =

- Active: September 1904 – September 1905
- Country: Russian Empire
- Type: Field Army
- Size: 81,799 men
- Engagements: Russo-Japanese War Battle of Mukden Battle of Sandepu

Commanders
- Notable commanders: See list

The 2nd Manchurian Army (Russian: 2-й Маньчжурская армия / 2 МА) was a field army of the Russian Empire that was established in 1904 during the Russo-Japanese War, to operate in Manchuria against Japan. It was one of the three such armies that were created and was disbanded in September 1905 after the end of the War.

== History ==
After the lost Battle of Liaoyang, Tsar Nicholas II of Russia decided to disband the "Manchurian Army", that encompassed all units of the Russian Imperial Army formations operating in the region against the Imperial Japanese Army under just one commander, and split it up in the 1st, 2nd, and 3rd Manchurian Armies.

The 2nd Manchurian Army was created in September 1904 under command of Lieutenant general Oskar Gripenberg. It counted 120 battalions, 79 squadrons, 439 guns, and a total of 81,799 men. On February 12, 1905, General Alexander von Kaulbars took over command of the army. It participated in the Battle of Shaho, Battle of Sandepu and Battle of Mukden.

After the end of the War, the 2nd Manchurian Army was disbanded in September 1905.

== Order of battle ==
The 2nd Manchurian Army consisted of the following units :

- 2nd Manchurian Army
  - 1st Siberian Army Corps
    - 1st Siberian Rifle Division
    - 9th Siberian Rifle Division
  - Combined Corps
  - 8th Army Corps
    - 14th Infantry Division
    - 15th Infantry Division
  - 10th Army Corps
    - 9th Infantry Division
    - 31st Infantry Division

== Commanders ==
The formation was commanded by :

- 09.1904-12.02.1905 : General Oskar Gripenberg
- 12.02.1905-09.1905 : General Alexander von Kaulbars.
