= Vasily Fedorovich Novitsky =

Russian general–historian (1869–1929)

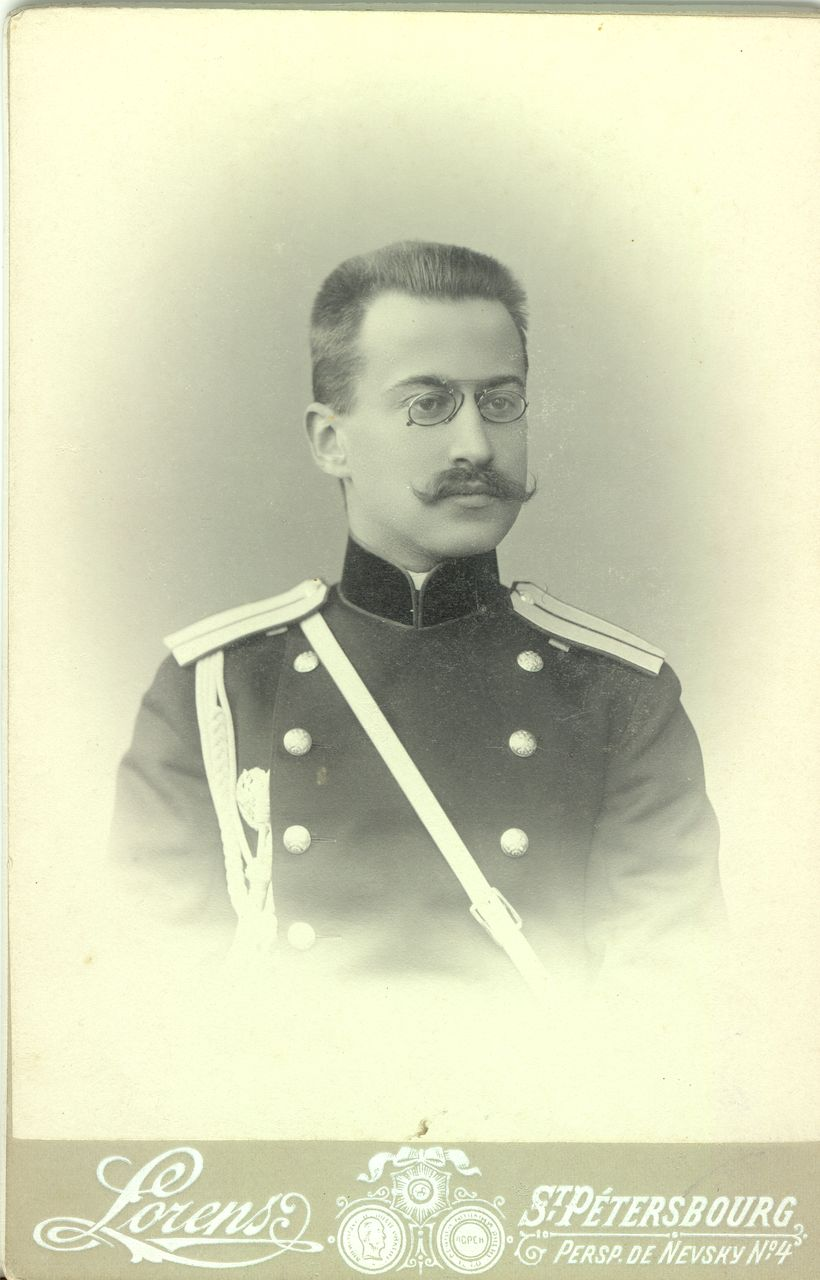
- Vasily Fedorovich Novitsky in 1917
- Born: 30 March 1869; Radom, Poland, Russian Empire
- Died: 15 January 1929 (aged 59); Moscow, Russian SFSR, Soviet Union
- Military career
- Allegiance: Russian Empire; Russian SFSR; Soviet Union
- Branch: Imperial Russian Army; Red Army
- Rank: Lieutenant General
- Conflicts: Boxer Rebellion; Russo-Japanese War; World War I; Russian Civil War

Vasily Fedorovich Novitsky (Russian: Василий Фёдорович Новицкий, 30 March [O.S. 18 March] 1869 – 15 January 1929) was a Russian general during the 19th century of Imperial Russia. During the Russian Revolution, in 1917, he sided with the Bolsheviks. One of the main editors of "Sytin Military Encyclopedia" of 1911–1915 (common name; officially just Military Encyclopedia), in charge of the first, "special military knowledge" department. Professor (1912), Honoured Worker of Science (1928).

== Biography ==
Novitsky was a brother of Yevgeny and Fyodor Novitskys. He graduated from the Mikhailovskaya Artillery Academy (1889) and the General Staff Academy (1895).

=== Russian Empire service ===
While Captain, in 1888, Novitsky spent four months as a guest of the Indian Army. His Indian studies were released in 1899, in a semi-classified document, Military Sketches of India, which he was held in high regard for, especially since he had detailed the dangerous Leh–Yarkand–Kashgar route.

He served as adjutant of the division headquarters and as an officer for errands at the corps headquarters. Novitsky fought in the Russo-Japanese War. From 1901 to 1904 he served as an officer of the General Staff. From 1906 to 1911, he took part in military-geographical expeditions to Mongolia, Afghanistan, India. From 1911 to 1914, he was a regimental commander, and at the same time was one of the editors-in-chief of the Military Encyclopedia (published by I. D. Sytin).

During World War I, Novitsky was part of the Northern Front, responsible for fighting the Central Powers from Riga in the north down to northern Belarus.

=== Military Encyclopedia ===
Initially, Novitsky was completely independent regarding editing, but starting with the fifth volume, K. I. Velichko became the editor responsible for coordinating the work of all four departments. Novitsky was authorised for first department – special military knowledge (Russian: специальных военных знаний) – and the assistant editor was A. V. Héroys. This department covered the following areas of military affairs:

- military strategy;
- military tactics;
- military history;
- statistics;
- military geography;
- topography;
- education and training of troops;
- information about international armed forces.

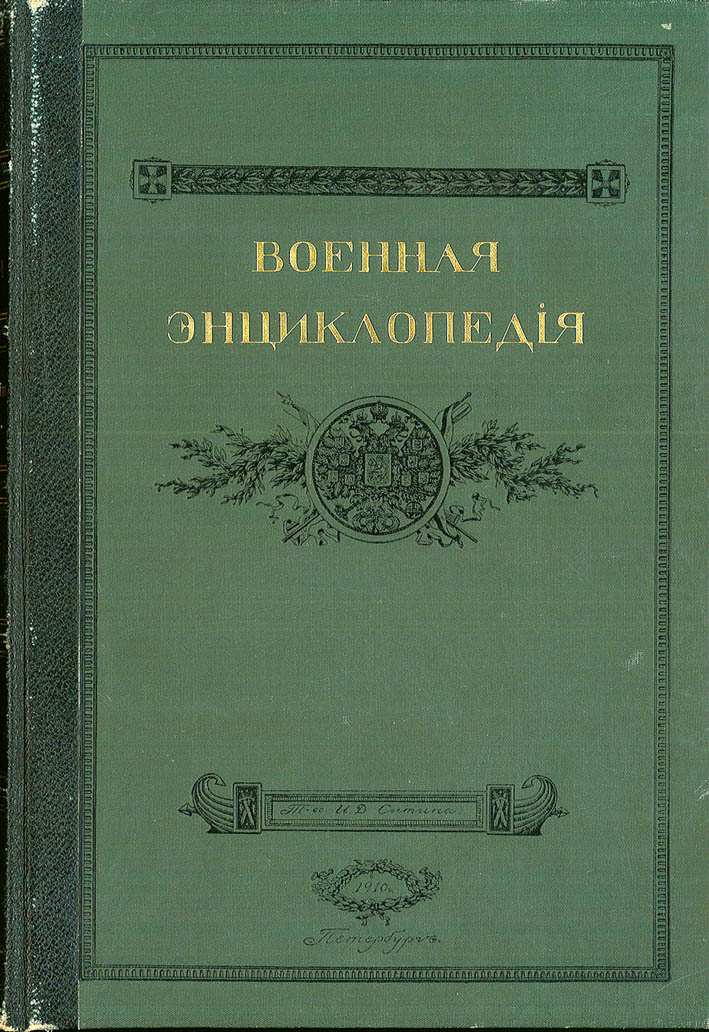
Cover of the 1st volume of "Sytin Military Encyclopedia"

=== Soviet Union ===
When the Russian Revolution destroyed Imperial Russia, Novitsky came to accept the new social and political change. In Soviet history, he is credited by historians with having made "a notable contribution to the rise and evolution of Soviet military art."

From October 1919 to 1929, he was a professor at the Military Academy of the Red Army at the Department of History of Wars and Military Art. Novitsky successfully combined his teaching activity with research work and created works on military geography, military administration, history of the Russian–Japanese and 1st World wars.

His military-geographical studies collected extensive data on physical geography, economic geography, and military geography of Mongolia and India.

On the basis of archival documents and personal experience he generalised the military actions of the 2nd Manchurian Army in the battles on the Shaho River, near Mukden and in the battle of Sandepu. Contributed to the development of the 1st World War history. Novitsky's military-historical works still retain their scientific value.

== Works ==
- Arrangement of the armed forces of Austria-Hungary (Russian: Устройство вооруженных сил Австро-Венгрии). Pt. 1. Kiev, 1898
- Military Sketches of India (1899)
- Cossacks, Cossack groups, Cossack military forces (1915)

== Read also ==
His namesake, Vasily Dementyevich Novitsky, who lived at the same time as Vasily Fedorovich (do not confuse the two), was with a liberal, progressive viewpoint, most famously known for his liberal handling of the 1899 Russian student strike, as he was called in to handle protesting students as a military officer. He was the head of the Kiev Gendarme. But when he arrived, he saw that the student demonstrations were peaceful, and "he brought in the dean, who was immediately offered an armchair by the side of the chairman [of the student demonstrators]." The student chairman said to the rector, "We wanted to meet with you, but you wouldn't have it! So you have been fetched here by the gendarmes!"

But in 1902, as the head of the Kiev gendarme, Vasily Dementyevich became more menacing towards revolutionary elements. He systematically interrogated members of the group Iskra, who were emigre Socialist Revolutionaries, and for whom he was planning a great, state trial, hoping that he could get a heavy sentence passed against the revolutionaries.
