= Pyotr Lomnovsky =

Pyotr Nikolayevich Lomnovsky
- Born: 1871
- Died: March 2, 1956 (aged 84–85)
- Allegiance: Russian Empire; White movement
- Branch: Imperial Russian Army
- Rank: Lieutenant general
- Commands: 15th Infantry Division; 8th Army Corps; 10th Army; Western Front
- Conflicts: Russo-Japanese War; World War I Russian Civil War

Pyotr Nikolayevich Lomnovsky (1871 – March 2, 1956), was a Russian military commander. He served as Lt. Gen. General Staff of the Imperial Russian Army.

== Early life ==
Lomnovsky graduated from the Tiflis Cadet Corps for general education.

== Start of service ==
He started his military service as private junker by entering the 1st Pavel Military School, graduated in 1891. After the graduation he was assigned to the Volhynian Life Guards Regiment. In 1898 he graduated from the Nicholas General Staff Academy (1898).

On May 13, 1899, he was appointed assistant to the senior Adjutant headquarters of the Caspian region. On August 7, 1899 he reached the headquarters of the 2nd Turkestan Army Corps. From September 22, 1901, he was the Chief of Staff of the Amur headquarters. On December 25, 1903, he became a headquarters officer in the management of the 8th East-Siberian Rifle Brigade. From February 24, 1904, he was head of staff of the 8th East-Siberian Small division.

== Military career ==
At the beginning of the Russo - Japanese War, he was appointed Senior Adjutant Office, General Quartermaster in the 1st Manchurian Army. On August 5, 1905 he became headquarters officer for the Office and administration of General quartermaster in the Far East. He was awarded a gold gun for military service. On March 27, 1906, he took the post of Chief of Staff of the 6th East Siberian Rifle Division. On November 2, 1908 he became commander of the 24th Siberian Rifle Regiment, and on August 21, 1912, commander of the District general quartermaster at the Kiev headquarters. The First World War began and Lomnovskogo was appointed acting Chief of staff of the 8th Army. In September 1914, he was awarded the Order of St. George (4th article). On July 17, 1915, he commanded the 15th Infantry Division and on April 7, 1917, the 8th Army Corps.

Lomnovsky participated in the Battle of Mărăști. The 4th Army was operating alongside the 2nd Romanian Army. On July 24, together with the 8th Army Corps, the attack administered the Germans a serious defeat, and the following day it continued, but was minimized by A.F. Kerensky. In July, he participated in the Battle of Ojtuze. On July 12, 1917 he commanded the 10th Army (Western Front), but because the appointment was made only a few days before the offensive in which the 10th Army was assigned a major role, Lomnovsky was unable to prepare it thoroughly. The 2nd Caucasian Army Corps refused to go to the offensive. The army comprised the following Army Corps: 3rd, 20th, 38, 1st Siberian, being on the 10th and 50th. On 22 July Lomnovsky launched an army offensive that was unsuccessful, the casualties amounted to 6.000-7,000 killed. On September 9, 1917 he was suspended from command of the 10th Army moving to the reserve at the headquarters of Kiev.

After the October Revolution, he moved to Don, where he was asked to join the Volunteer Army. In 1918 he was appointed by Denikin as his representative to the Hetman of Ukraine Pavlo Skoropadskyi.

In 1919 he emigrated to Sofia, then moved to Nice where he died on 2 March 1956. He was buried in Kokad Cemetery.

== Awards ==
- Order of Saint. Stanislav 3rd Art. (1899);
- St.. Anne of Art (1902);
- St.. Stanislav 2nd St. With Swords (1905);
- St.. Vladimir, 4th of art. With Swords and Bow (1905);
- Gold weapons (MP 18.06.1906);
- St.. Anne of St. With Swords (1907);
- St.. Vladimir III. (1908; 22.02.1909);
- St.. Stanislav 1-th art. (06.12.1913);
- St.. St. George's 4th article. (MP 27.09.1914);
- St.. Anne of Art. (MP 01.1915);
- St.. Vladimir, 2nd article (MP 19.02.1915).

== Additional Reading ==
- Lomnovsky, Peter Nikolayevich on the Russian army in Great War website
- Biography on Kronos

Military offices
Preceded by	Commander of the 15th Infantry Division	Succeeded by
Preceded by	Commander of the 8th Army Corps	Succeeded by
Preceded by Nikolai Kiselevsky	Commander of the 10th Army; July 4 – September 9, 1917	Succeeded by Ali-Agha Shikhlinski
Preceded by Anton Denikin	Commander of the Western Front; July 31 – August 5, 1917	Succeeded by Pyotr Baluyev
