= Battle of Mukden =

Decisive battle of the Russo-Japanese war

- Part of the Russo-Japanese War
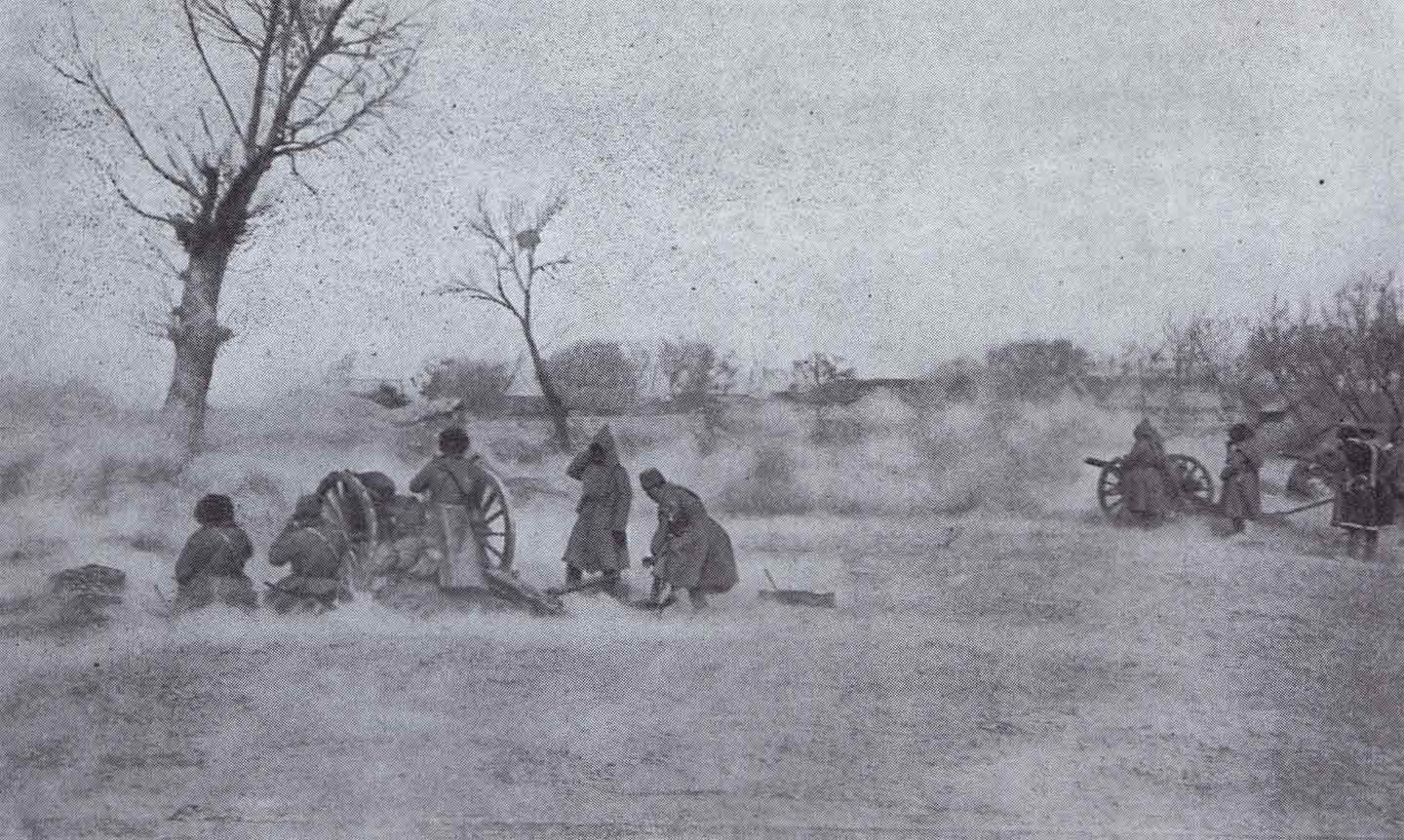
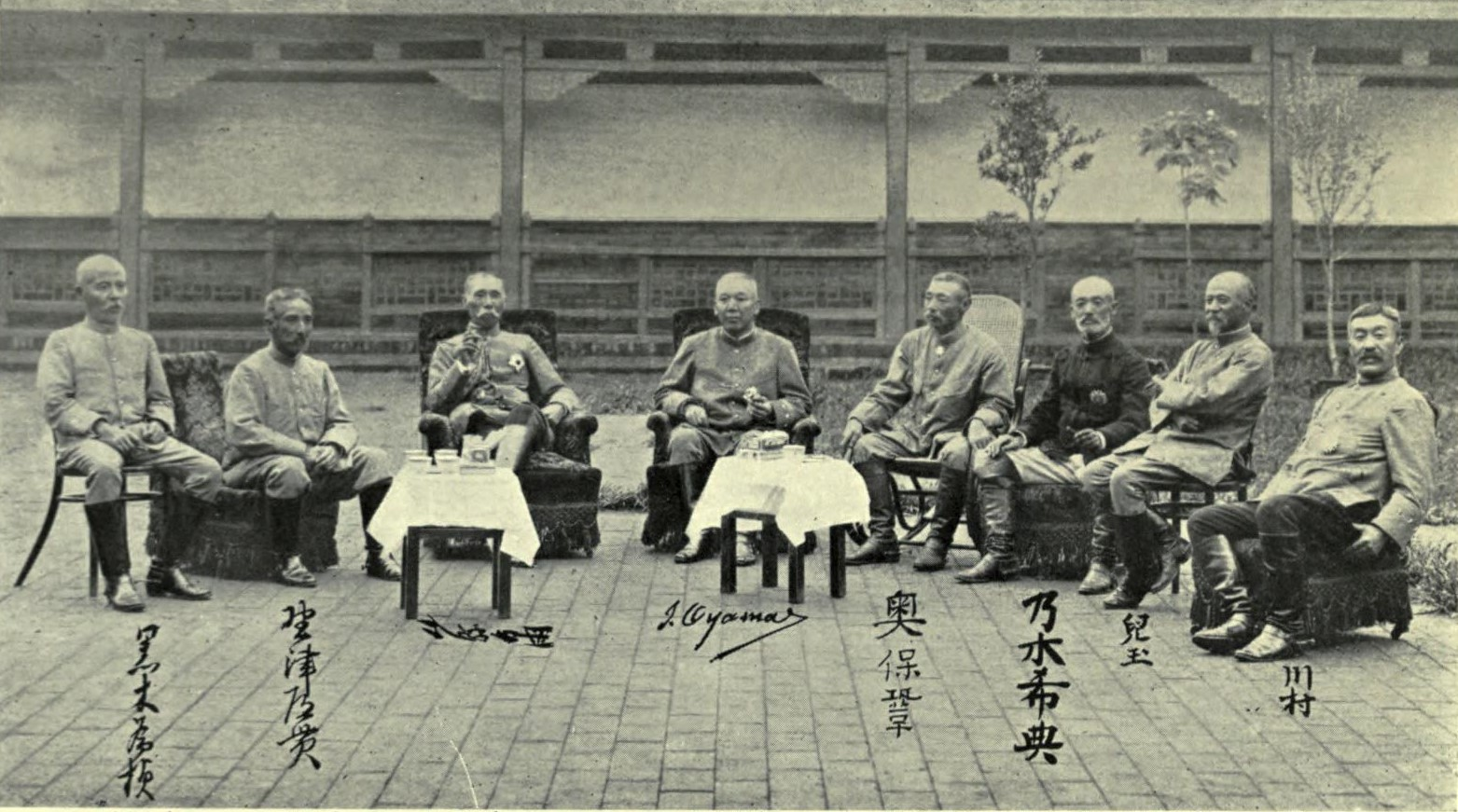
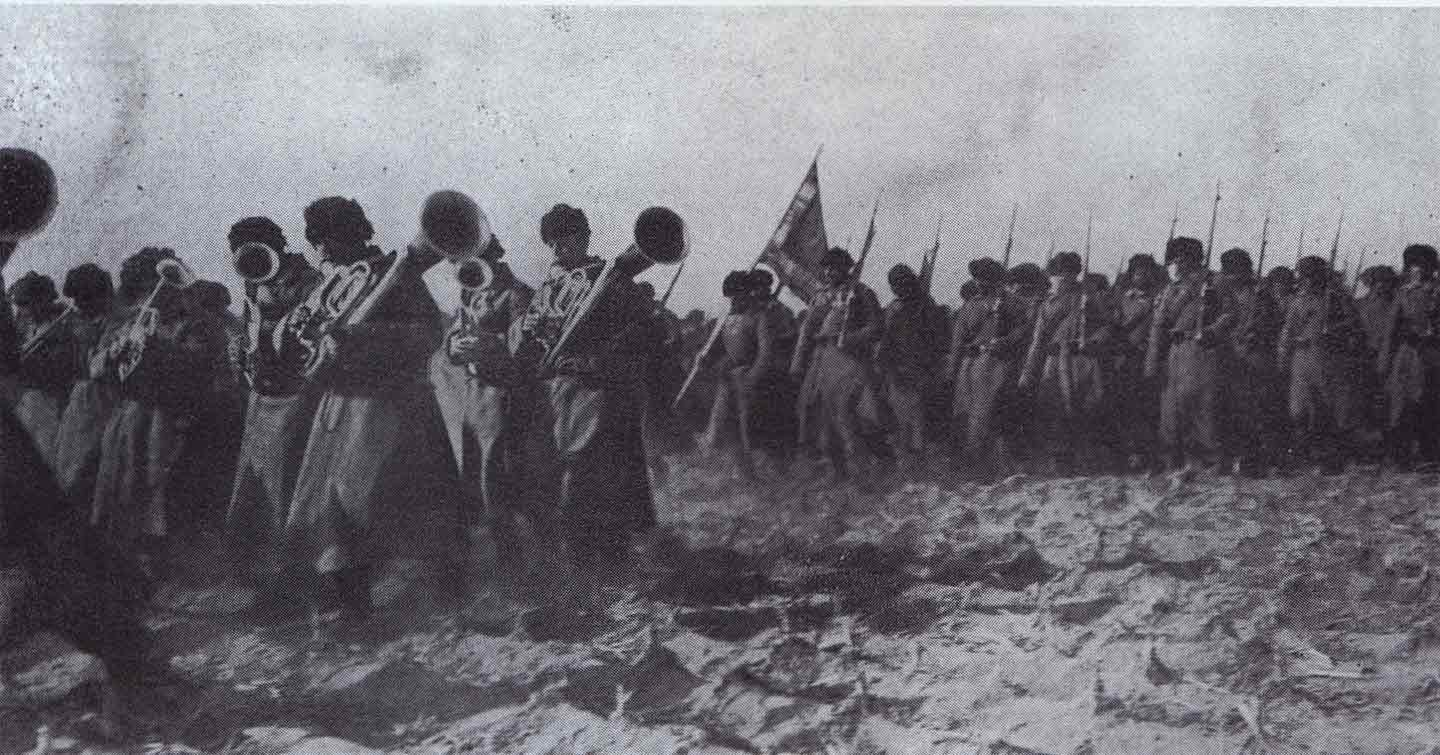
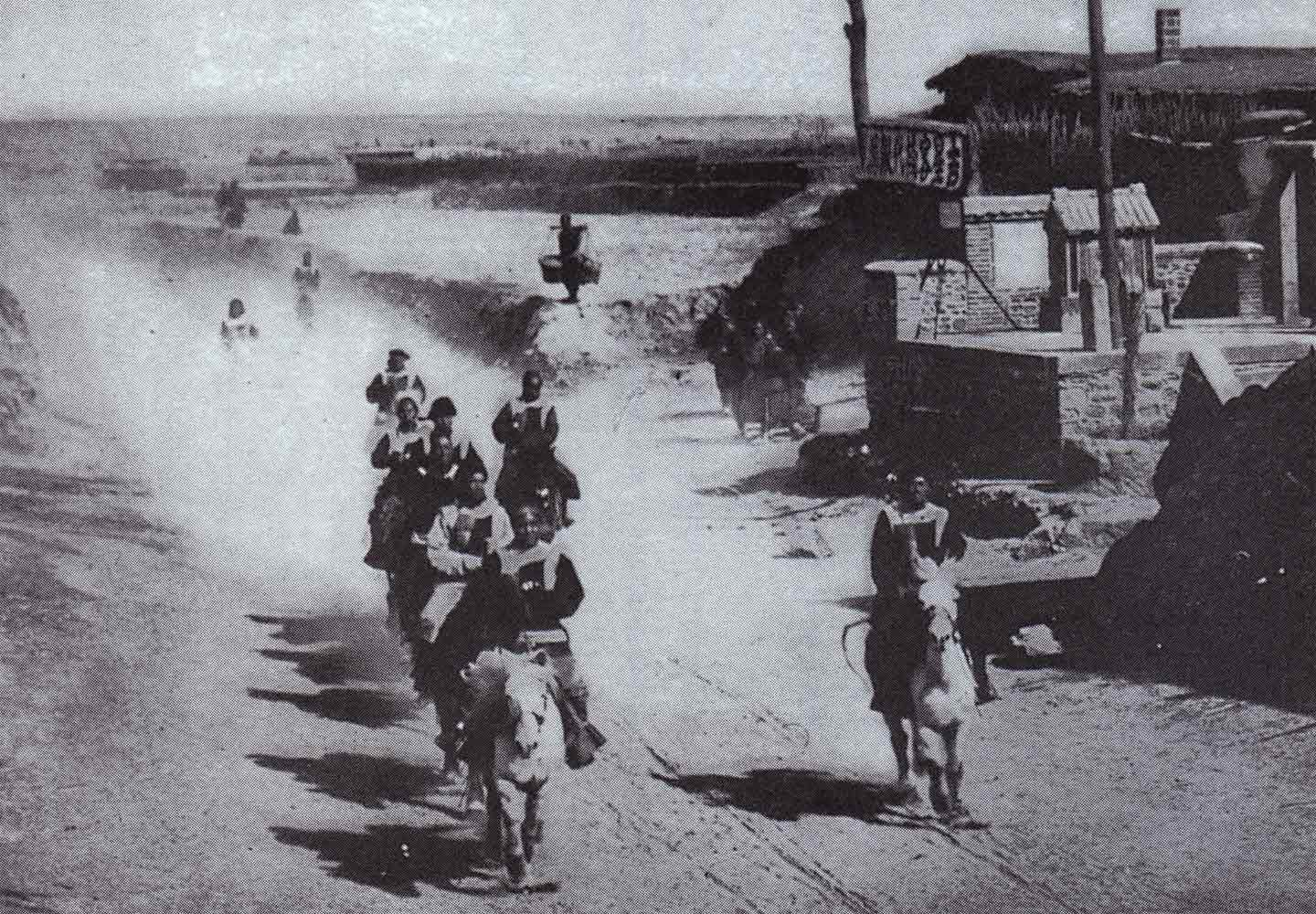
- Clockwise from top-left: Russian field guns firing; Meeting of the Japanese commanding officers; Chinese mounted bandits; March of the 55th Podolia Regiment
Date	19 (6) February – 10 March (25 February) 1905 (2 weeks and 5 days)
Location	Near Mukden (modern Shenyang), Manchuria, Qing dynasty 41°47′N 123°26′E
Result	Japanese victory

Belligerents
Japan	Russian Empire

Commanders and leaders
Ōyama Iwao; Kuroki Tamemoto; Oku Yasukata; Nogi Maresuke; Nozu Michitsura; Kawamura Kageaki	Aleksey Kuropatkin; Nikolai Linevich; Alexander Kaulbars; Alexander Bilderling

Units involved
1st Army; 2nd Army; 3rd Army; 4th Army; 5th (Yalu) Army	1st Manchurian Army; 2nd Manchurian Army; 3rd Manchurian Army

Strength
Total: ~250,000; 199,254 infantry; 7,353 cavalry; 992 guns; 254 machine guns	Total: ~292,000; 275,666 infantry; 16,382 cavalry; 1,219 guns; 56 machine guns

Casualties and losses
Total: 70,029; 16,553 killed; 53,476 wounded	Total: 89,423; 8,705 killed; 51,388 wounded; 29,330 missing in action, of which ~20,000–25,000 were captured

The Battle of Mukden (Note: Russian: Мукденское сражение, romanized: Mukdenskoye srazheniye; Japanese: 奉天会戦, romanized: Hōten kaisen; traditional Chinese: 奉天會戰; simplified Chinese: 奉天会战; pinyin: Fèngtiān Huìzhàn) (19 February – 10 March 1905) was fought in the Russo-Japanese War between the Russian Empire and the Empire of Japan near the town of Mukden (now Shenyang, China). Involving close to 550,000 troops and resulting in over 150,000 casualties, it was the largest battle of the war, as well as the last major engagement on land. The Battle of Mukden was a strategic victory for the Japanese that, coupled with their victory at sea in the Battle of Tsushima four months later, proved critical in ending the war in Japan's favour.

It was the largest modern-era battle fought prior to World War I, and possibly the largest battle in world history at that point. The scale of the battle, particularly in the amount of ordnance being expended, was unprecedented in world history. The Japanese side alone fired 20.11 million rifle and machine gun rounds and 279,394 artillery shells in just over ten days of fighting (while the Russians fired even more), matching the ammunition consumption of the German army in the entire 191-day Franco-Prussian War.

== Background ==
Following the Battle of Liaoyang (25 August – 4 September 1904), Russian forces retreated to the river Sha Ho south of Mukden and regrouped. The Japanese had expected Liaoyang to be the decisive battle of the war, after which peace terms would be negotiated. However, in part due to the diversion of much manpower and most of the heavy artillery to the simultaneously ongoing Siege of Port Arthur, the Japanese had failed to take advantage of their victory at Liaoyang, allowing the Russians to retreat in good order and to soon launch a counterattack during the Battle of Shaho (12–14 October). Though unsuccessful, the battle ended without a decisive victory for either side, which increasingly pushed Japan into an unfavourable war of attrition against Kuropatkin's forces, which were being continuously reinforced. A second Russian counter-offensive, the Battle of Sandepu, fought from 25 to 29 January 1905, was also unsuccessful.

Though the combined Russian army led by General Aleksey Kuropatkin was set to receive reinforcements via the unfinished Trans-Siberian Railroad, the effects of the Bloody Sunday and the now-ongoing unrest at home placed a strain on the manpower of the whole Imperial Army as much of its resources now had to be dedicated in the quelling of the uprisings throughout its territories. Therefore, the Russian force was expected to receive little to no reinforcements and supplies from home.

The situation for the Japanese was hardly better. Though the capture of Port Arthur by General Maresuke Nogi freed up their 3rd Army, which then advanced north to reinforce the Japanese lines near Mukden in preparation for an attack, the manpower reserves of the Japanese army had been drained by February 1905. With the arrival of General Nogi's 3rd Army, Japan's entire fighting strength was concentrated at the vicinity of Mukden. The severe casualties, bitter cold climate, and approach of the Russian Baltic Fleet created pressure on Marshal Ōyama to effect the complete destruction of the Russian forces, rather than just another victory from which the Russians could withdraw farther into Manchuria.

== Opposing forces ==
=== Russian forces ===
The Russian line to the south of Mukden was 90 miles (140 km) long, with little depth and with a central reserve:

- The 1st Manchurian Army under General Nikolai Linevich, held the hilly terrain on the east flank. This flank also held two-thirds of the Russian cavalry, under General Paul von Rennenkampf. General Kuropatkin had thus disposed his forces in a purely defensive layout, from which it would be difficult to impossible to execute an offensive without opening a major gap in the lines.
- The 2nd Manchurian Army under General Kaulbars (who had replaced the unfortunate General Oskar Gripenberg), on the right flank in the west, on flat ground.
- The 3rd Manchurian Army under General Bilderling, in the center, holding the railway and the highway.

=== Japanese forces ===
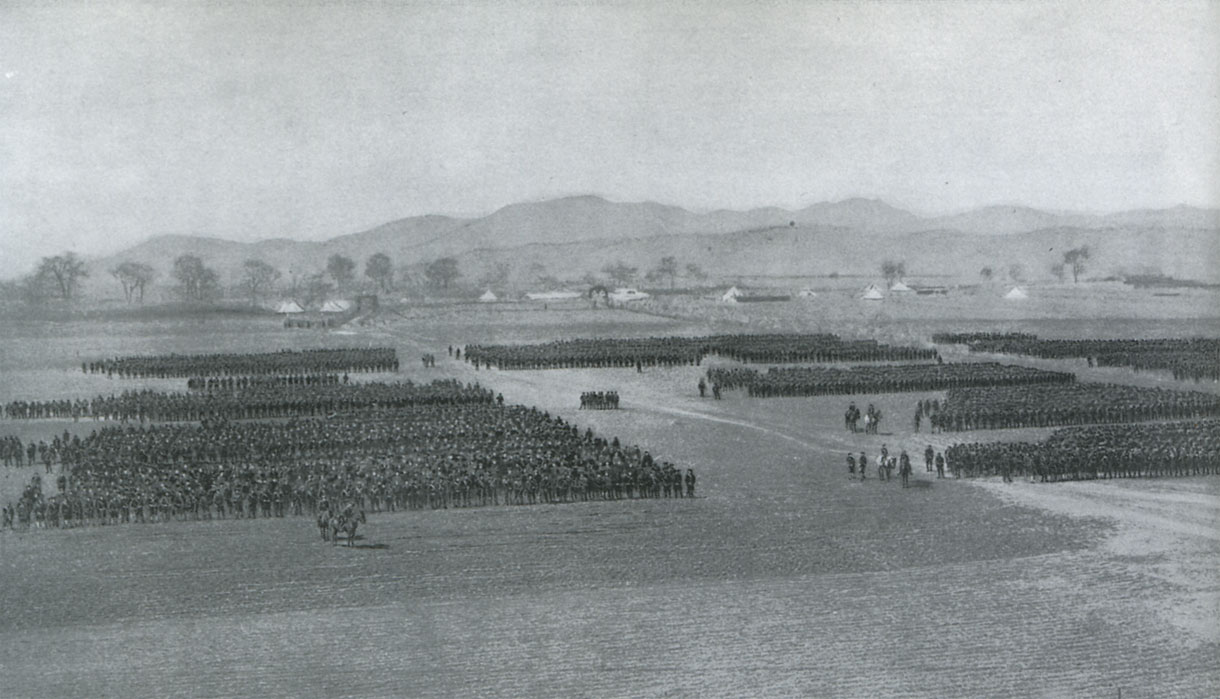
Formation of a Japanese division of the 1st Army

On the Japanese side, Oyama had arranged this troops thus:

- The 1st Army, commanded by General Kuroki, advanced to east of the rail line.
- The 2nd Army, commanded by General Oku advanced to the west.
- The 3rd Army, commanded by General Nogi, was kept concealed behind the 2nd Army until the start of battle.
- The 4th Army, commanded by General Nozu, also advanced to east of the rail line.
- The 5th (Yalu) Army, commanded by General Kawamura, provided a major diversion on the Russian eastern flank.

The Yalu Army was much under strength, and consisted only of the IJA 11th Division (from Port Arthur) and reservists. Despite that, it was technically not part of the Japanese Manchurian Army but was directly subordinate to the Imperial General Headquarters.

General Kuropatkin was convinced that the main Japanese thrust would come from the mountainous eastern side, as the Japanese had proven themselves effective in such terrain, and the presence of the former 3rd Army veterans from the 11th Division in that area reinforced his convictions.

Field Marshal Ōyama's plan was to form his armies into a crescent to encircle Mukden, cutting off the possibility of Russian escape. He was explicit in his orders that combat within the city of Mukden itself was to be avoided. All during the war, the Japanese had pursued a meticulous civil affairs policy aimed at avoiding civilian casualties and keeping the Chinese populace on their side – a stark contrast with the previous First Sino-Japanese War and subsequent Second Sino-Japanese War.

== Battle ==
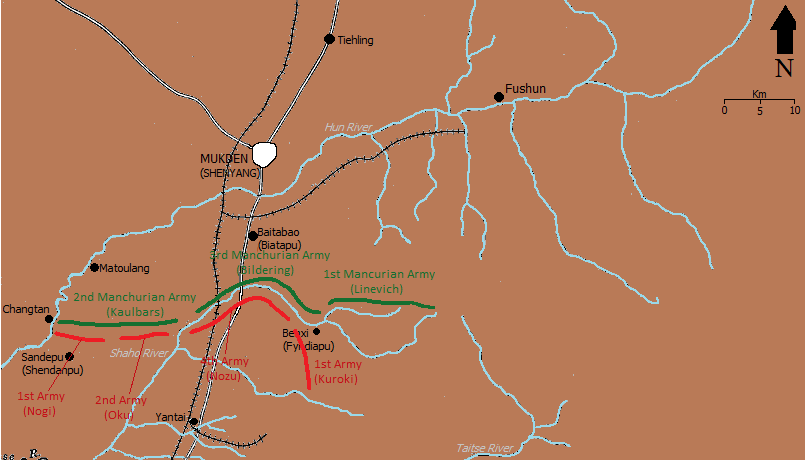
Positions of armies by 23 February, the Army of Manchuria of the Imperial Japanese Army in red and the Imperial Russian Army in green.

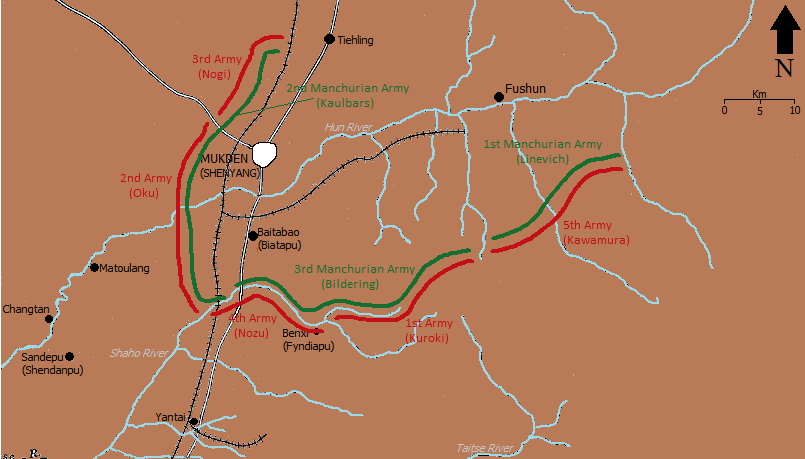
Positions of armies by 2 March: the Japanese Army of Manchuria advances northward and via its 3rd and 2nd Armies perform a wide flanking maneuver to the west to envelop the Russian force which was withdrawing north towards Mukden to assume better defensive positions.

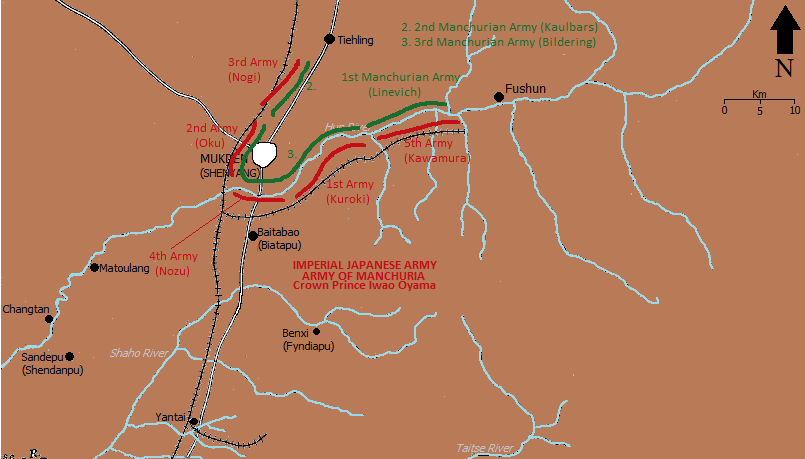
Positions of armies by 7 March: the Russian army finally consolidates its position north of the Hun river and in front of the Trans-Siberian Railroad with the city of Mukden as its pivot, the Japanese launch numerous attacks to dislodge subsequent enemy dispositions.

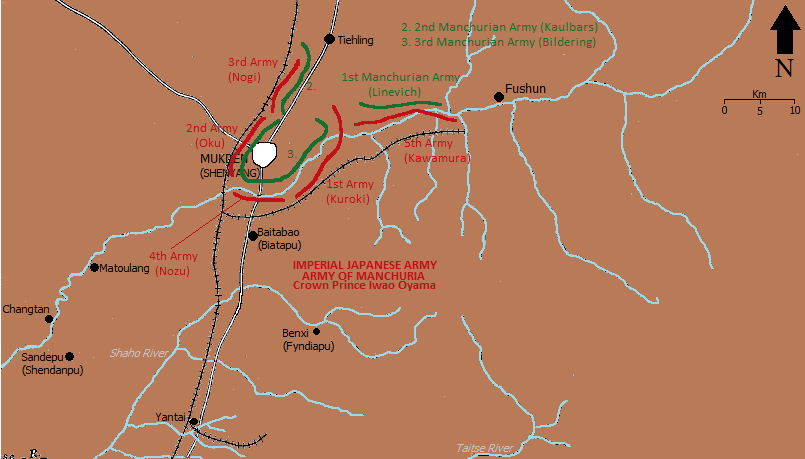
Positions of armies by 8 March: after successive attacks, the Japanese finally create a breach on the center of the Russian lines, imperiling the whole Russian defense.

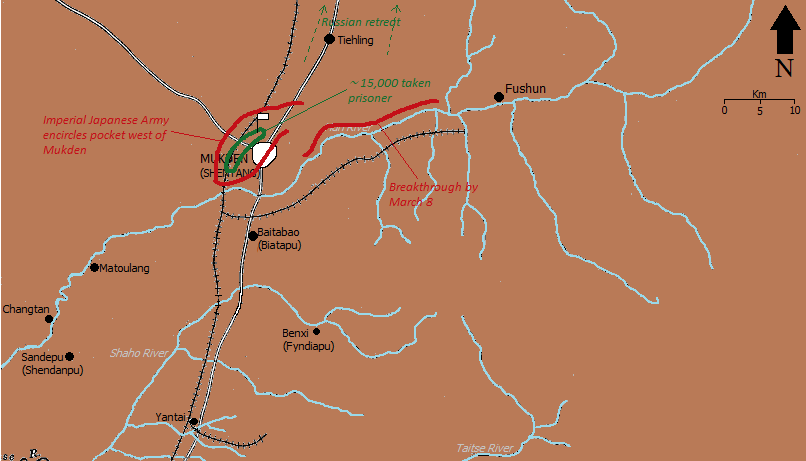
Conclusion, 10 March: with the overall situation hopeless the Russian army then retreats northward, much of the Japanese army finish off the remnants of a pocket west of Mukden while the rest pursue the enemy until halting due to exhaustion.

=== Opening phase ===
Just prior to the battle, on 9 February, General Mishchenko (who had suffered a foot injury at Sandepu) was replaced by General Rennenkampf, who took over his command of the Russian right cavalry detachment. He was ordered to clear the western side of the Hun-Ho River of Japanese troops which had managed to establish themselves there after Sandepu. Rennenkampf quickly began executing this task from 14–16 February using four cavalry brigades, but was then forced to transfer two of these back to Kuropatkin, who used them to secure the rail lines in the north.

On the eastern flank, General Alekseev (sometimes spelled Alexeiv) took command of the Chenghocheng Detachment (Russian: Цинхеченский отряд) from Rennenkampf. This detachment was just larger than a division and was composed of a mix of infantry, cavalry and artillery. It extended the Russian lines by around 30 kilometres south-east of the 1st Manchurian Army along the Sha-Ho river and was meant to provide early warning and room for maneuver in case of a Japanese attempt an envelopment from that flank. Alekseev did not arrange his force as one continuous line, but instead as two main forces: one, commanded by General Liubavin, was around 15 kilometres away from the main Russian line, while the second, under General Ekk, was a further 10 kilometres east. These two forces held several hills in the area and covered important mountain passes through the area, while the space separating them consisted of difficult terrain.

Kawamura began advancing his 5th (Yalu) Army on the night of 18–19 February to reach a preassigned start point some 20 kilometres from his original position near the village of Piao-tsy-iuan. On 20 February, Kawamura conducted a probing attack on the Chenghocheng Detachment with eight battalions and 12 guns. Alekseev reacted by notifying Linevich on the same day, who dispatched four machine guns and a regiment of the 6th East Siberian Rifle Division to aid Alekseev. On 21 February, the Japanese and Russian forces mainly exchanged artillery fire without any significant movement.

On 22 February, using Linevich's reinforcements, Alekseev attempted an attack on the opposing Japanese Kobi (reserve) division and 11th Division. Crossing very icy ground on an exceptionally cold day in four columns, the Russians made little progress. After encountering Japanese artillery fire, the Russians mounted a weak attack but broke contact after suffering some 150 casualties, retreating to their original defensive positions.

On 23 February, the Japanese Kobi and 11th divisions attacked Alekseev's Chenghocheng Detachment in full force. Despite terrible weather conditions, the Japanese attacked with considerable determination, but were nevertheless unable to make much progress in the face of strong Russian hill defences.

The Japanese renewed their attack on 24 February. The 9th Kobi brigade, aided by infantry and sappers from the 11th Division, was able to storm some of the Russian hilltops. Shortly after, the Japanese began firing on the remaining Russian positions, which retreated to the next line of hills. Alekseev, whose original mission was mainly to screen and delay the Japanese, rather than hold ground indefinitely, then decided to retreat even further by moving his force around 10 kilometres west, such that it would be around 10 kilometres east of Linevich's 1st Army.

Kuroki began moving the 2nd Division of his 1st Army on the same day, advancing to the right of Kawamura's 5th Army. After encountering some Siberian Cossacks, Kuroki and Kawamura were now positioned according to Oyama's plans for further pressure to Linevich's eastern flank. This caused some worry among the Russians, and so Linevich began reinforcing his 3rd Siberian Corps, while Kuropatkin decided to delay the planned offensive on the Russian right (the western flank), towards Sandepu, and instead keep additional troops in reserve (rather than reinforcing Kaulbars' 2nd Army) in case the eastern flank demanded it.

Kuropatkin grew so concerned about the left flank that he transferred the 1st Siberian Army Corps and two other brigades to Linevich's 1st Army, equal to around 42 battalions and 128 cannons. He also transferred Rennenkampf — who had a reputation of high competence — back to commanding the Chenghocheng Detachment instead of Alekseev.

On the night of 24–25 February, Kuroki began applying increasing pressure to Linevich's 1st Army, especially his 3rd Siberian Army Corps, mainly in the form of night skirmishes and infiltrations. Kawamura similarly tried advancing in the east, but was unable to do so due to poor weather and difficult terrain. Meanwhile, as the threat to his left flank around Sandepu had been minimised, Oyama decided to transfer most of the Japanese 3rd Division from Oku's 2nd Army to support Nogi's future advance instead. On 26 February, Kuroki continued applying pressure towards Linevich, attempting to stretch his flank east, towards Chenghocheng, though poor weather and terrain again impeded the Japanese from major advances.

By 26 February, Rennenkampf had returned to command the Chenghocheng Detachment, where he decided to retreat some 7–10 kilometres north and consolidate his position there. The temperature dropped to a record low of −8 °F (−22 °C) and Rennenkampf was able to halt Kawamura's advance, limiting the combat on the extreme east to exchanges of artillery fire. Kuroki, using his easternmost units, attempted to exploit a gap the Japanese thought was forming between Rennenkampf and Linevich, but was unable to do so: Linevich had positioned his Cossacks unexpectedly close to Rennenkampf, which hampered the Japanese advance.

At this point, Linevich possessed greater forces than the opposing Japanese in his area, and suggested to Kuropatkin that he might advance and turn the right flank of Kuroki's 1st Army. However, nothing came of the suggestion, while the Japanese high command decided to switch their focus to the rest of the (hitherto largely static) battlefield.

=== Japanese attack and Russian counterattack ===
In the centre, the Japanese and Russian fronts were largely separated by the Sha-Ho river, with the former south of it, while the latter were north of it. The Putilov and Novgorod hills, however, were held by the Russians and were south of the river. This area of the front was held by Bilderling's 3rd Manchurian Army, with his three corps holding only a narrow 18 kilometre strip. The opposing Japanese forces were a modest three divisions commanded by Nozu's 4th Army. In the face of the superior Russian position, Nozu did not attempt a frontal assault, instead focusing on fixing Bilderling's troops in place by the use of 108 heavy artillery pieces, including the 28 centimetres (11 in) howitzers, some of the heaviest artillery deployed on land at that point. The Japanese started a large-scale artillery barrage on 27 February, but the Russians were able to return accurate fire while suffering only minimal casualties thanks to their well-prepared fortifications and good positions.

Also on 27 February, Oyama ordered Nogi's 3rd Army to begin advancing on the Western flank. Planning to eventually envelop the Russian 2nd Manchurian army by attacking north and then east, the Japanese made quick progress on that day: the Cossack units opposing them limited themselves to observation only, withdrawing from direct combat, thus allowing the 9th Division to advance 10 kilometres, while the 1st Division and cavalry advanced nearly 20 kilometres.

The Japanese continued their advance the following day. Kaulbars' cavalry commander, General Grekov, attempted to block the Japanese but poor coordination and leadership meant that the Russians barely encountered the Japanese; the Russian cavalry suffered fewer than 20 casualties that day. Russian intelligence was also lagging behind the actual Japanese movements, reporting that the Japanese had advanced less than they had in reality. Kaulbars and Kuropatkin now both saw the Japanese 3rd Army's advance on their right as a serious threat: the former began gradually peeling troops from the centre towards his flank, but the latter was indecisive and still saw the east as a threat, thus confusingly deploying his reserves to both the left and right flanks.

By 1 March, the Japanese 2nd Cavalry Brigade was already 15 kilometres north-east of Mukden, while the 1st Infantry Division had managed to advance some 24 kilometres. Kuropatkin rushed reinforcements in the form of the Ural Cossacks and the 2nd Brigade of the 41st Infantry Division, which had marched nearly 60 kilometres in a single day to reach the right flank of the Russian armies. Nogi's advance closer to the centre was less successful: the 9th Division and 1st Cavalry began an assault the Russian positions at Ssu-fang-tai, but suffered heavy casualties (with around 700 men killed) as the Russians had great visibility from their hilltop fortifications. By mid evening, however, Kaulbars ordered a retreat due to the worsening situation in the north.

At the same time, Oku's 2nd Army began attacking Kaulbars from the south. Despite numeric inferiority, the Russians were able to leverage their artillery to great effect, also inflicting heavy casualties on the advancing Japanese 8th Division before being forced to retreat. Likewise, the Japanese 5th Division initially made good progress over flat and open terrain, but was then engaged by Russian machine gun fire: the 11th Regiment, one of four in the division, lost close to one thousand men alone.

Kuropatkin continued transferring troops to his right flank, but did so in a way that heavily eroded unit cohesion and made command difficult. 16 battalions (and then 32 more) were taken from the reserve and Kaulbars' 2nd Army to form a division-sized unit to counter Nogi's advance in the north, but there was great confusion due to the staff, commanders and positions changing quickly between different units in the Russian force. By contrast, the Japanese had managed to preserve their original force structure and were still acting according to their initial plans.

By 2 March, the Russians were still forming a new force to defend the west and north. The 25th Division, taken from the reserve, along with the 'composite' division created by combining different battalions, formed the centre of this force and were positioned around 15 kilometres west of Mukden. The 1st Siberian Corps was still transferring from the east, while Kaulbars was scraping together troops from his line to form two new divisions for Kuropatkin. A Russian brigade from the composite division attempted a counterattack into the Japanese-held village of Sha-lin-pu (previously occupied by the Japanese 7th Division), but was repulsed due to a lack of artillery and stiff Japanese resistance. The Russians had greater success further south, where they managed to take back two villages and capture 7 Japanese machine guns along with 64 men.

Kaulbars now took command of the new western grouping assembled by Kuropatkin, while the weakened 2nd Army was given to General von der Launitz. In the confusion of leadership transfer, Oku's 2nd Army successfully advanced some 10 kilometres, pushing the Russians to form a west-facing line that connected at a right angle to Bilderling's south-facing 3rd Army.

In the meanwhile, the counterattacks by the Russian 25th Division ended in failure, leading it to retreat 5 kilometres east (together with the 'composite' division). At the same time, the remnants of the Russian 2nd Army were being pursued by Oku, such that the Russian right flank was now only 10 kilometres west of Mukden. Kuropatkin decided to move his headquarters directly to Mukden and to prepare for a large-scale counterattack on the 4 or 5 March. On the eastern flank of the battlefield, vicious fighting between the Japanese and Russians continued, despite that area now being of secondary importance to the overall battle. Fountain Hill changed hands numerous times before Rennenkampf committed his last reserves to holding it, losing over 1,000 men in the course of battle; Nikolai Danilov's units lost around 500. Kawamura continued his advance despite similarly heavy losses, leaving Fountain Hill in neither side's hands by 3 March. Oyama grew concerned over the stiffness of Russian resistance (and even attempted counterattacks), leading him to order Kuroki to assist Kawamura by moving his 2nd Division further east.

By 4 March, the western front was only 10 kilometres or so west of the north-south rail line running from Mukden. This put a limit to how much the Russians could further retreat, as their logistics could come under threat otherwise. Kuropatkin agreed to delay his counterattack to 5 March after discussion with Kaulbars, who urged more time to assemble the units: some, like the 1st Siberian Corps, had been moved from the right flank to the left flank and back in the space of a week (without seeing combat), leading their organisation to be severely impaired by Kuropatkin's indecisive movements.

The Japanese had grown confident in their imminent victory and consequently missed the massing of Russian forces in the west, leading Oyama to issue Nogi with orders that presumed a continued advance like prior, without significant enemy resistance. Instead, the attacks of Japanese 7th and 9th Divisions were halted by heavy Russian artillery, which didn't permit the Japanese to advance close to the Russian lines. Nearer the centre, the Japanese 2nd Army was pursuing the shattered Russian 2nd Army across their former positions, but was stopped by the river Hun-Ho. In order to advance past the river, the Japanese started pressuring Bilderling's forces in the centre, where bloody fighting ensued with multiple back and forth attacks. Oyama now committed his last reserves in the form of three Kobi brigades to Nogi's 3rd Army.

The planned Russian offensive on 5 March ended in failure: Kuropatkin decided to attack only on the western section of the front (rather than across the entire line to maintain the initiative), while Kaulbaurs also decided to limit the offensive to his right flank, consisting of 50 battalions commanded by Lieutenant General Gerngross. For unknown reasons, despite receiving orders from Kuropatkin to begin the attack at 09:30, Gerngross waited for five more hours before beginning the attack; even then, it began with a series of low-intensity scouting actions, leading to the main thrust not starting until the late afternoon. These delays meant that only a quarter of his troops advanced on that day, and only one regiment managed to hold new ground.

Then Field Marshal Ōyama seized the chance he had been waiting for, and his orders to "attack" were changed to "pursue and destroy". Luck was further with the Japanese due to the late thaw in the weather. The Hun River, guarded by the Russian left flank commanded by Major General Mikhail Alekseyev, remained frozen, and was not an obstacle to the Japanese attack. However, as they crossed the river, the Japanese attack was hampered when they encountered stiff resistance and heavy artillery fire coming from the Russians, now commanded by General Paul von Rennenkampf, resulting in yet more heavy casualties. After heavy fighting the Japanese succeeded in taking the northern bank of the river, causing the Russian defense lines defending the bank to collapse and the far edge of their left flank to be partially cut off from the rest of the main body of Kuropatkin's army. At the same time a salient was formed just 15 kilometers west of Mukden, enabling the Japanese to totally encircle the Russians on their right flank in the process.

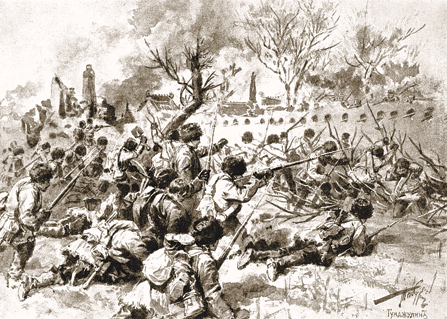
Russian troops in combat against Japanese troops

=== Retreat of the Russian forces ===
All but encircled and with no hope for victory, General Kuropatkin gave the order to retreat to the north at 18:45 on 9 March. The Russian withdrawal was complicated by General Nozu's breach through Russian rearlines over the Hun River.

At 10:00 AM on 10 March, Japanese forces occupied Mukden. After they occupied Mukden the Japanese continued their hard-driven pursuit of the Russians, but this was hampered when Ōyama knew that his army's supply lines were stretching too thin; however, he continued the pursuit of the enemy, though in a lazy, slow manner. The pursuit was stopped 20 kilometers short of Mukden, but the Russians were already fleeing farther north from Tiehling towards the Sino-Russian border at a fast pace, and the battle was over with the Japanese as the victor.

Throughout the battle, many foreign military observers were present in order to observe how the next great war might be fought. The Battle of Mukden heavily foreshadowed the tactics to be used in World War I.

== Casualties ==
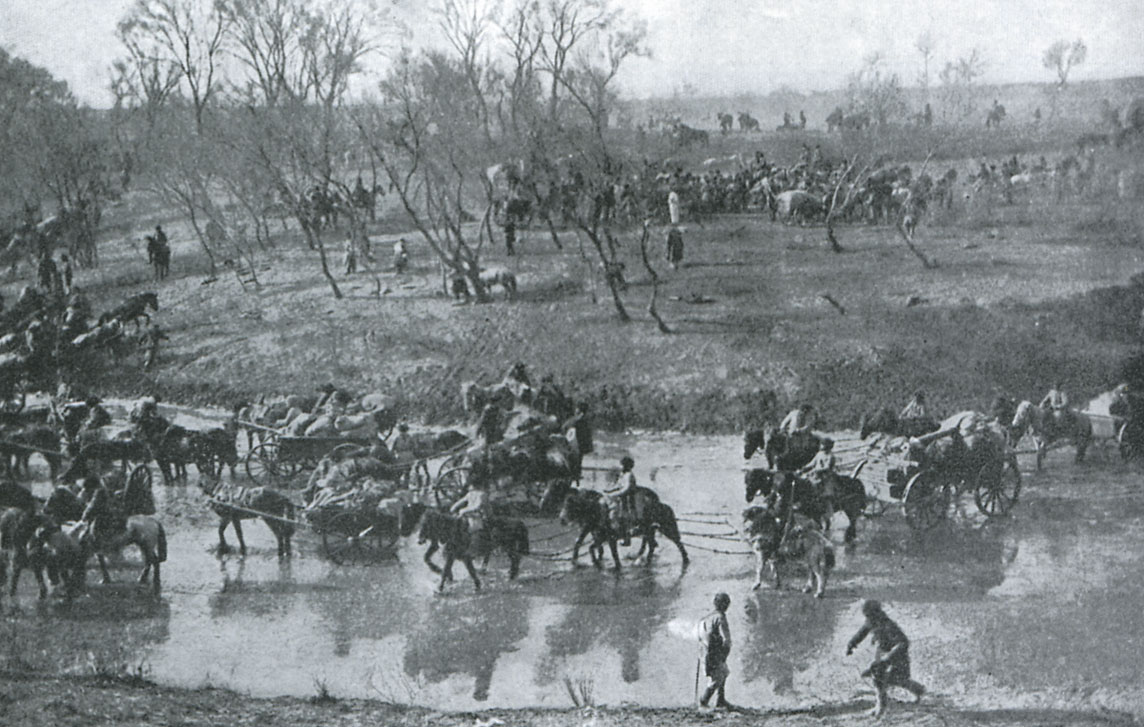
Retreat of Russian soldiers towards the Sino-Russian border after the battle

Japanese and Russian casualties
Army	Killed	Wounded	Missing in action	Total
Japanese 1st	1,925	8,818	—N/a	10,473
Japanese 2nd	5,093	13,084	—N/a	18,177
Japanese 3rd	4,585	13,938	—N/a	18,523
Japanese 4th	3,691	13,197	—N/a	16,888
Japanese 5th	1,529	4,439	—N/a	5,698
(Japan) Japanese total	16,553	53,476	—N/a	70,029
Manchurian 1st	3,483	17,687	3,515	24,685
Manchurian 2nd	3,369	21,013	16,799	41,181
Manchurian 3rd	1,853	12,688	9,016	23,557
(Russia) Russian total	8,705	51,388	29,330	89,423

Russian casualties amounted to nearly 90,000, of which 8,705 were killed in action, 51,388 were wounded in action and 29,330 were missing in action (and of those, 20,000–25,000 were captured, primarily in the last 28–48 hours of the battle).

Japanese casualties consisted of 16,553 killed and 53,476 wounded, totalling 70,029 altogether.

== Legacy ==
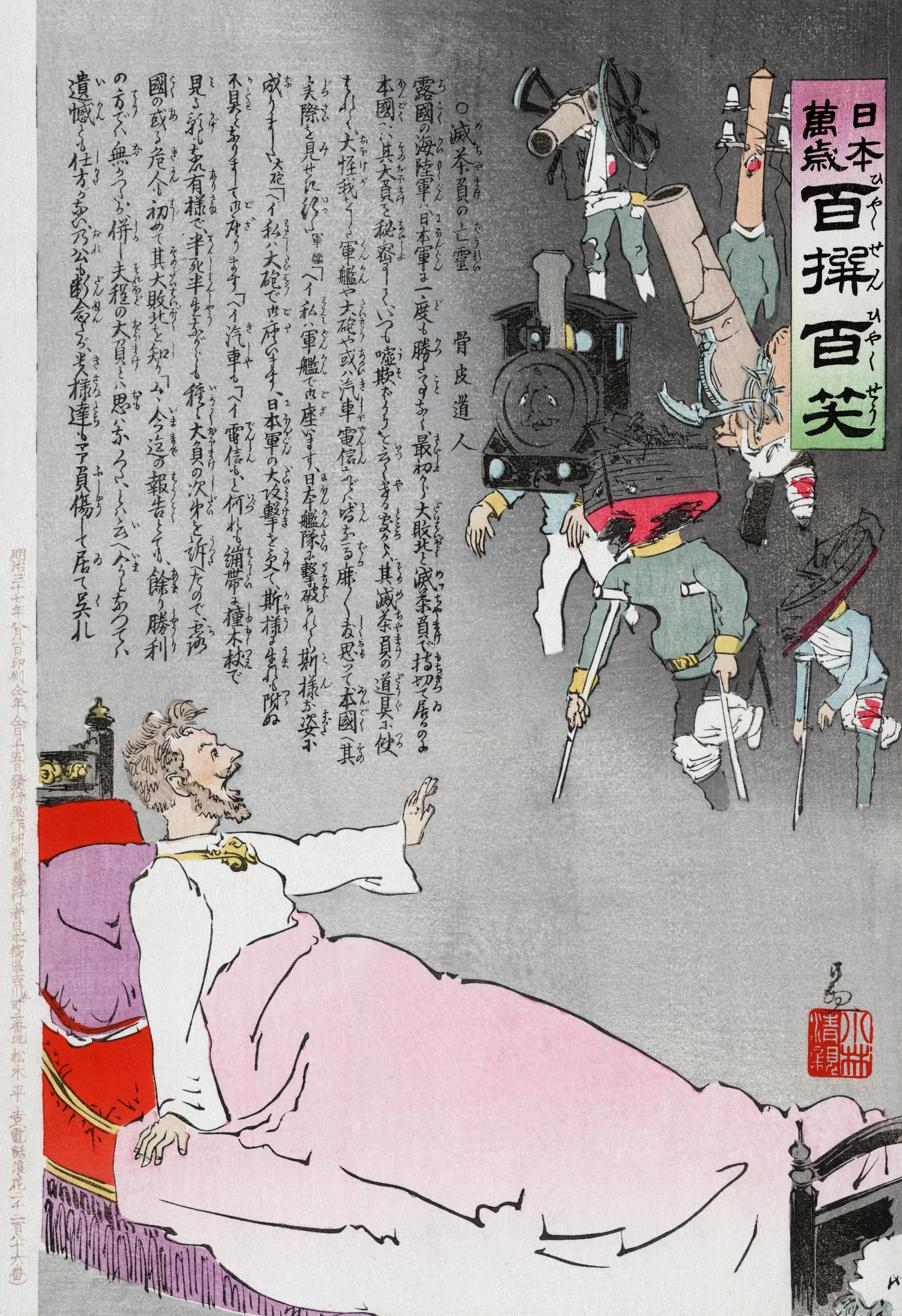
Japanese propaganda from the war: woodcut print showing Tsar Nicholas II waking from a nightmare of the battered and wounded Russian forces returning from battle. Artist Kobayashi Kiyochika, 1904 or 1905.

=== War impact ===
With the defeat of the Russian Manchurian Army in Mukden, the Russian forces were driven out of southern Manchuria. However, with problems concerning its overstretched supply lines, the Japanese army failed to destroy the Russian forces stationed in the region completely and Kuropatkin's forces, though severely demoralized and short of supplies, were still largely intact. But the battle of Mukden was decisive enough to shatter the Russians' morale and, with the unfinished Trans-Siberian railroad now in Japanese hands, undermined the tsarist government's war effort. The final, decisive battle of the war would be eventually fought on the waters of Tsushima.

=== Worldwide ===
The victory shocked the imperial powers of Europe, as the Japanese proved overwhelming throughout the battle despite the Russians having more manpower and material. It showed that European armies were not automatically superior to those of other nations, and could be even decisively outmatched in battle. The battle had confirmed the Japanese army as the 6th largest army in the world.

=== In Russia ===
Tsar Nicholas II was particularly shocked, when the news reached the palace in St. Petersburg, that the tiny Asian island nation of Japan - approximately 2% of Russia's landmass - could defeat the powerful and huge Russian empire. The tsarist government was irritated over the incompetence and clumsiness of their commanders during the battle. The generals Aleksandr Samsonov and Paul von Rennenkampf began to loathe each other as Samsonov very publicly accused von Rennenkampf of failing to assist him.

=== In Japan ===
After Japan won the wider Russo-Japanese war, 10 March (conventionally defined as the date of Japan's victory at Mukden) became an annual celebration of a new Army Commemoration Day. The twentieth anniversary of the battle in 1925 saw a nationwide celebration at a large scale: 50,000 schoolchildren were brought to witness the Konoe Division parade outside the Imperial Palace while planes performed aerial stunts. In Tokyo, the entirety of the 1st Division performed drills, shouted three banzais and proceeded to the Meiji Shrine. Crown Prince Hirohito consecrated the ceremonies by observing a sumo tournament at the Yasukuni Shrine.

== See also ==
- Honghuzi – Chinese bandits at times recruited by the Russians or Japanese
- Soviet invasion of Manchuria – considered by Stalin (among others) as revenge for the Russo-Japanese War
- Karafuto Prefecture – southern Sakhalin occupied by Japan after the end of the war

== Bibliography ==
- Valitutto, John (2025). Mukden 1905: Russia and Japan's Battle for Manchuria. Osprey Publishing. ISBN 9781472864208.
- Dickinson, Frederick (2005). "Commemorating the war in post-Versailles Japan". In Steinberg, John (ed.). The Russo-Japanese War in Global Perspective: World War Zero. Vol. I. Brill Publishers. ISBN 90 04 14284 3.
- Steinberg, John (2005). "The Operational Overview". In Steinberg, John (ed.). The Russo-Japanese War in Global Perspective: World War Zero. Vol. I. Brill Publishers. ISBN 90 04 14284 3.
- Matsusaka, Yoshihisa Tak (2005). "Human bullets, General Nogi, and the myth of Port Arthur". In Steinberg, John (ed.). The Russo-Japanese War in Global Perspective: World War Zero. Vol. I. Brill Publishers. ISBN 90 04 14284 3.
- Tohmatsu, Haruo (2005). "Approaching total war: Ivan Bloch's disturbing vision". In Steinberg, John (ed.). The Russo-Japanese War in Global Perspective: World War Zero. Vol. II. Brill Publishers. ISBN 978 90 04 15416 2.
- Connaughton, Richard (2003). Rising Sun and Tumbling Bear. Cassell. ISBN 0-304-36657-9
- Higgins, David R. "The Battle of Mukden: A Strategic & Tactical Analysis-The rising empire of Japan defeated the Russians in what was then the largest land battle ever fought." Strategy and Tactics 270 (2011): 26+.
- Kowner, Rotem (2006). Historical Dictionary of the Russo-Japanese War. Scarecrow. ISBN 0-8108-4927-5
- Nish, Ian (1985). The Origins of the Russo-Japanese War. Longman. ISBN 0-582-49114-2
- Palmer, R. R.; Colton, Joel; Kramer, Lloyd (2007). A History of the Modern World (10th ed.). Boston: McGraw-Hill. ISBN 978-0-07-310748-6.
- Tucker, Spencer (23 December 2009). A Global Chronology of Conflict: From the Ancient World to the Modern Middle East: From the Ancient World to the Modern Middle East. ABC-CLIO. ISBN 978-1-85109-672-5.
