= Casimir Gripenberg =

Carl Gustaf Casimir Gripenberg
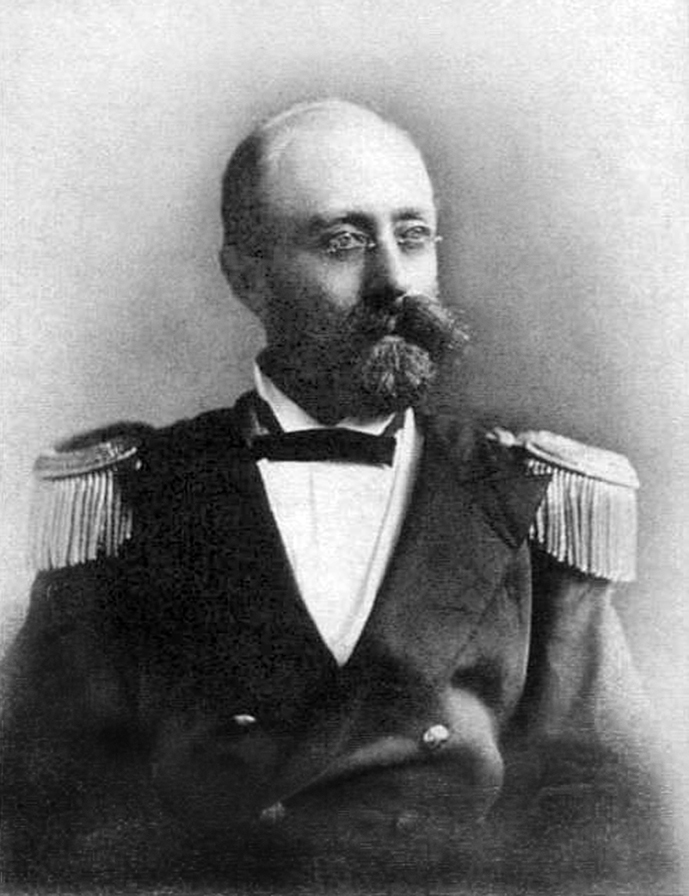
- Rear-Admiral Carl Gripenberg
- Born: 18 November [O.S. 6] 1836; Grand Duchy of Finland, Russian Empire
- Died: 5 April [O.S. 24 March] 1908 (aged 71); Tsarskoye Selo, Saint Petersburg, Russian Empire
- Military career
- Allegiance: Russian Empire
- Branch: Imperial Russian Navy
- Service years: 1855 – c. 1900
- Rank: Rear Admiral
- Conflicts: Crimean War; Russo-Turkish War

Carl Gustaf Casimir Gripenberg (Russian: Казимир Казимирович Гриппенберг, Kazimir Kazimirovich Grippenberg; 18 November [O.S. 6] 1836 – 5 April [O.S. 24 March] 1908) was a Finland–Swedish naval officer who served in the Imperial Russian Navy. He was a member of the Finland-Swedish noble Gripenberg family, and was the older brother of General Oskar Gripenberg.

== Biography ==
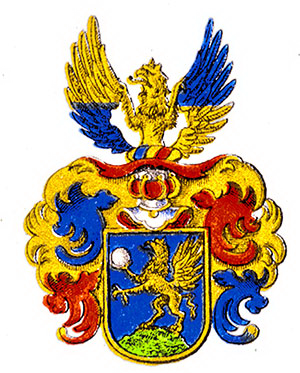
Coat of arms of the Gripenberg family

=== Family ===
The Swedish noble Gripenberg family comes from the Swedish province of Östergötland, and the original family name was Witte or Wittman before being granted nobility status. The first ever known member of the family was Jacob Jöransson Witte (died 1659), who was a resident in the county of Östra Eneby socken in Östergötland. His son, Johan Wittman (1637 – 1703) was a military designer in the Västerbotten Regiment, and was granted nobility and the surname of Gripenberg in 1678.

=== Naval career ===
Gripenberg was a cadet in St Petersburg from 1846 and was appointed midshipman in the Baltic Fleet in 1855. He served in the Baltic during the Crimean War and afterwards in the Mediterranean. Gripenberg circumnavigated the world in the clipper Razbojnik between 1858 and 1863. In 1863 he was promoted to lieutenant and transferred to the 6th Marine Corps, moving to the 11th Marine Corps in 1864. He joined the Siberian Fleet in 1865 and was appointed to command the gunboat Morzh and then the schooner Vostok. In 1872 he was appointed to command of the steamer America before, from 1875, serving as chief of staff to the commander of the Russian ports on the Pacific Coast.

Gripenberg returned to the Baltic Fleet in 1878 as commander of the frigate Sevastopol. He commanded the cruiser Europa on her 1878-79 voyage to the east coast of the United States, he went on to visit Singapore, Nagasaki and Vladivostok on his way back to Kronstadt. He was appointed to command a division of nine torpedo boats in the Gulf of Finland in 1885 and commanded the frigate Admiral Greigh from 1887. He received command of the 13th naval squadron in 1891 and retired as a rear admiral in the following year.

== Honours and awards ==
=== Domestic ===
- Order of St. Anna, 3rd class (1868)
- Order of St. Stanislaus, 3rd class for "round-the-world voyage" (1869)
- Order of St. Stanislaus, 2nd class (1873)
- Order of St. Anna, 2nd class for "the highest review of the steamship" (1879)
- Order of St. Vladimir, 4th class (1882)
- Order of St. George, 4th class with a bow "in honor of 26 years of maritime campaigns" (1885)
- Order of St. Vladimir, 3rd class (1891)
