= Januarius Tsikhovich =

Russian commander

Januarius Kazimirovich Tsikhovich
- Born: September 7, 1871; Radom, Congress Poland, Russian Empire
- Died: uncertain
- Allegiance: Russian Empire; Second Republic of Poland
- Branch: Imperial Russian Army; Polish Army
- Commands: 10th Army Corps (Russian Empire); 3rd Army (Russian Empire); 7th Army (Russian Empire)
- Conflicts: Russo-Japanese War; World War I Polish-Soviet War

Januarius or Yanuary Kazimirovich Tsikhovich (Russian: Януарий Казимирович Цихович; born September 7, 1871 – death date unknown) was a Russian commander, lieutenant general (6/12/1915), division general of the Polish Army.

== Biography ==
Orthodox. From the nobles. He graduated from the Radom classic gymnasium with a gold medal. He was educated at military schools at the Moscow Infantry Junker School. Issued in the 14th art. brigade.

In 1897 he graduated from the Nikolaev Academy of the General Staff in the first category. He served at the headquarters of the Vilna Military District (01/17/1898 - 09/22/1901). The censored command of the company was serving in the 108th infantry. Saratov Regiment (01.10.1900-01.10.1901).

Since September 1901 - headquarters officer for special assignments at the headquarters of the 1st Siberian Army Corps. Lieutenant Colonel (1901). Since May 26, 1903 - the headquarters officer for special assignments under the commander of the forces of the Amur Military District. He commanded the Nikolaev crepe. infantry regiment (09.27.1903-23.02.1904).

Member of the Russian-Japanese war of 1904–1905, he served in the headquarters of the Manchurian army and commander in the Far East. S 24.8.1905 and.d. chief of staff of the 2nd Siberian Infantry Division, from 3.3.1906 chief of staff of the 4th East Siberian Rifle Division.

== Military ranks ==
- Lower ranks from June 2, 1889;
- Second Lieutenant since August 5, 1891 with seniority from August 10, 1890;
- Lieutenant since July 25, 1895 with seniority from August 10, 1894;
- Headquarters Captain since May 19, 1897;
- Captain since April 18, 1899;
- Lieutenant Colonel since December 6, 1901;
- Colonel since December 26, 1905

== World War I ==
On December 7, 1910, the commander of the 26th Siberian Rifle Regiment, with whom the First World War entered. For the battle near the village of Kuryan, 08/19/1914 he was awarded the Order of St. George of the 4th degree (order 26.4.1915). Then he was appointed chief of staff of the 1st Turkestan AK. On 7/8/1915, the chief of the 1st separate infantry brigade. From October 21, 1915 he was in the reserve of ranks at the headquarters of the Minsk Military District. Since December 17, 1915 - Head of the 44th Infantry. divisions.

On July 12, 1917, commander of the X Army Corps (temporarily commanded the corps in June). From August 11, 1917, the commander of the 3rd, from September 9, 1917 - the 7th army.

After the October Revolution, in response to a telegram from N.V. Krylenko dated December 1 (14), 1917, demanding to be guided by the provision on democratization sent by the Military Revolutionary Committee at Headquarters, wrote that "the army has already been democratized to such an extent that it has disappeared from the world’s scale and no one is reckoning with it" and removing shoulder straps, the only sign by which one can at least approximately distinguish the regiments of a multimillion-dollar army, "turns it into a gray crowd of human bodies." On December 3, 1917, the Bolshevik Military Revolutionary Committee removed Tsikhovich from the post of commander for liaising with the Ukrainian Central Rada and appointed in his place the staff captain Vladimir Triandafillov.

== In the Red Army ==
Since 1918 Tsikhovich in the service of the Red Army. In May 1918 he was a member of the Higher Attestation Commission (together with A.I. Egorov, Commissars N.I. Bessonov and E.V. Molchanov and General N.M. Voronov). The tasks of the commission included the establishment of a general certification procedure, consideration of certification of officers, and the preparation of candidate lists for filling team positions. At the same time, Tsikhovich participated in meetings of the underground Right Center.

Then - a member of the Military Historical Commission for the study and use of the experience of World War II. Compiled the first part of the "Strategic Essay on the War of 1914-1918." In 1920–1921, editor of the department of military literature at the RVSR.

In 1920, during the Soviet-Polish war, was arrested by the Cheka.

== In Poland ==
In June 1921 he emigrated to Poland. From March 15, 1922 to May 31, 1927 he was the chief inspector of the Polish customs guard.

By the beginning of the September War, he served as chief of the customs guard in Graevo. His further fate is not known.

== Awards ==
- Order of St. Stanislav 3rd Art. (1901);
- Order of St. Anne 3rd Art. with swords and bow (1905);
- Order of St. Vladimir, 4th art. with swords and bow (1905);
- Order of St. Stanislav, 2nd art. with swords (1905);
- Golden weapons (VP 18.06.1906);
- Swords and bow to the Order of St. Stanislav 3rd art. (1906);
- Order of St. Vladimir 3rd art. (1908; 03/09/1910).

== Works ==
- Military Survey of the Girin Province of Northern Manchuria. St. Petersburg: Military. typ., 1904.
- How the 5th Rifle Regiment near Mukden died: Memories of Gen. regiment headquarters. Tsikhovich. St. Petersburg: Tip-lit. "Energy", 1908.
- Strategic outline of the war of 1914-1918 Part I. The period from the declaration of war until the beginning of September 1914. The first invasion of the Russian armies in East Prussia and the Battle of Galicia. (Text version, DJVU version (inaccessible link))
- Operation 2 army in V. Prussia in August 1914. // Military historical collection. Issue 3.

== Literature ==
- Zalessky K. A. Who was who in the First World War. - M .: AST; Astrel, 2003 .-- 896 p. - 5,000 copies. - ISBN 5-17-019670-9 (ACT); ISBN 5-271-06895-1 (Astrel).
- Kavtaradze A.G. Military experts in the service of the Republic of Soviets. M., 1988.
- Tsikhovich, Yanuari Kazimirovich. // Project "Russian Army in the Great War".

Preceded by Nikolai Danilov	Commander of the 10th Army Corps; July 12 - August 11, 1917	Succeeded by
Preceded by Mikhail Kvetsinsky	Commander of the 3rd Army; August 11 - September 9, 1917	Succeeded by Ilia Odishelidze
Preceded by Vladimir Selivachyov	Commander of the 7th Army; September 9 - December 3, 1917	Succeeded by
