= 7th Army (Russian Empire) =

World War I Russian Army

The Russian 7th Army was a World War I Russian field army that fought on the Eastern theatre of war.

Field management was established in July 1914 at the headquarters of the Odessa Military District. The initial task of the Army was to guard the Black Sea coast and the border with Romania.

In October 1914 it was moved west and became part of the Southwestern Front. The 7th Army participated in the Brusilov Offensive in 1916, and Kerensky Offensive in 1917. It was disbanded in early 1918.

== Commanders ==
- 19 July 1914 – 19 October 1915 — General of Artillery Vladimir Nikolayevich Nikitin
- 19 October 1915 – 11 April 1917 — General of Infantry Dmitry Shcherbachev
- 13 April 1917 – 20 June 1917 — Lieutenant-General Leonid Bielkowicz
- 26 June 1917 – 9 September 1917 — Lieutenant-General Vladimir Selivachyov
- 9 September 1917 – 3 December 1917 — Lieutenant-General Januariusz Cichowicz

== See also ==
- List of Russian armies in World War I
- List of Imperial Russian Army formations and units
