= Oskar Gripenberg =

Finnish-Swedish general in the Russian army (1838–1916)

Oskar Ferdinand Gripenberg
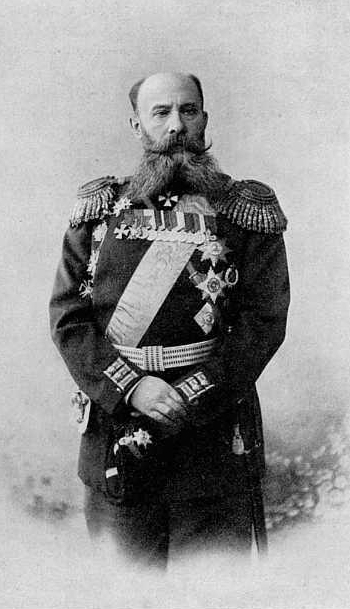
- General Gripenberg
- Born: 13 January 1838; Ikaalinen, Grand Duchy of Finland, Russian Empire
- Died: 7 January 1916 (aged 77); Petrograd, Petrograd Governorate, Russian Empire
- Military career
- Allegiance: Russian Empire
- Branch: Russian Imperial Army
- Service years: 1854–1906
- Rank: General of the Infantry
- Commands: 1st Division, Imperial Russian Guard; Russian 2nd Manchurian Army
- Conflicts: Crimean War; January Uprising; Russo-Turkestan War; Russo-Turkish War; Russo-Japanese War

Oskar Ferdinand Gripenberg (Russian: Оскар-Фердинанд Казимирович Гриппенберг, romanized: Oskar-Ferdinand Kazimirovich Grippenberg; 13 January 1838 – 7 January 1916) was a Finnish-Swedish general of the Russian Second Manchurian Army during the Russo-Japanese War.

== Biography ==
Oskar Ferdinand Gripenberg was born in Ikaalinen (Swedish: Ikalis), Grand Duchy of Finland, the son of Uddo Sten Casimir Gripenberg and Maria Wilhelmina Elisabeth Ladau. The Gripenberg Family was granted nobility in the Swedish Empire in 1678. His brother, Carl was an admiral in the Imperial Navy. Oskar Ferdinand Gripenberg married Hedvig Ida Angelique Lundh in 1874. They had four children.

=== Early career ===
Gripenberg began his military career in 1854 as a cadet in the ranks of the Russian Crimean Army. His first combat experience in the Crimean War against the British and the French, and he was named in dispatches for bravery on 2 November 1855. As part of the Russian force which suppressed the Polish uprising in 1863-1864 he was promoted to lieutenant. He was subsequently assigned to the Turkestan Military District, where he was assigned to command a line battalion of infantry from Orenburg and was promoted to major in 1866. He then commanded the 5th Turkestan Battalion, participating in numerous battles in the Turkestan War, including the conquest of the Emirate of Bukhara and the storming of the fortress of Ura-Tube. For these campaigns, he was awarded the Order of St. Anne (3rd Class with Swords and Bow) and the highly prestigious Order of St. George (4th degree), and was promoted to lieutenant-colonel. This was an unusual distinction as the award was normally only given to officers of at least general's rank.

Gripenberg was further awarded the Order of St. Stanislav (2nd class) and Golden Sword of St. George with the inscription "For Bravery" in 1869. He was made commander of the 17th Infantry Battalion in 1872 and promoted to colonel. In 1877 he became commander of the 2nd Infantry Battalion of the elite Imperial Russian Life-Guards. He saw combat again during the Russo-Turkish War of 1877–1878, where he was awarded the Order of St. Vladimir (3rd degree with Swords), Order of St. Stanislaus (1st degree), and Order of St George (3rd degree) in 1877, and promotion to major general on 22 February 1878.

In 1890 Gripenberg became commander of the prestigious First Division of the Moscow Life Guards and was promoted to lieutenant general. He lost this position in 1898 after criticizing heavy-handed Russian actions in Finland. He was eventually promoted to general of infantry in 1902, reassigned to command the Russian 6th Army Corps in 1900, and in 1904 was honored with the title aide-de-camp to Nicholas II.

=== Russo-Japanese War ===
Gripenberg was assigned to command the Russian 2nd Manchurian Army during Russo-Japanese War, arriving at Mukden on 28 November 1904. Gripenberg was extremely critical of the war of attrition tactics adopted by commander-in-chief General Aleksey Kuropatkin, who had hoped to draw the Imperial Japanese Army deep into Manchuria, where its supply lines would be overextended as part of a delaying tactic until the completion of the Trans-Siberian Railway would bring overwhelming Russian reinforcements. On arriving in Mukden, Gripenberg repeatedly told his men that anyone retreating from their position in the upcoming campaign would be shot. During the ensuing Battle of Sandepu in January 1905, Gripenberg perceived a weakness in the Japanese lines and launched a surprise assault that threw the enemy's left flank into disarray. However, Kuropatkin refused to commit troops to support his offensive, directly leading to the Russian defeat. Relations between the two officers had been strained from the beginning and Gripenberg asked to be relieved of his command of the 2nd Manchurian Army on 29 January 1905, only a day after the battle ended. Tsar Nicholas II allowed Gripenberg to return to Saint Petersburg immediately, although he was not formally relieved until March. Gripenberg lost no time in publicly blaming Kuropatkin for Russia's defeats, which sparked a war of words between the two men in the press.

=== Final career ===
Nicholas II still thought highly of Gripenberg, and on 30 April 1905 appointed him Inspector General of the Infantry on 28 June 1905, and as a member of the State Council. As Inspector General, he developed a new manual for shooting, but on 23 March 1906, frustrated by health, he resigned from active service, but remained on the State Councilor nominally as General-Adjutant. He spent his final days in continuing his campaign against Kuropatkin in the newspapers, pamphlets and books, blaming him for the Russian defeat at the Battle of Mukden and for the loss of the war in general. He died on 7 January 1916 in Petrograd and was buried in the Tsarskoselsky Cemetery.

== Honours ==
- Order of St. George, 4th class, 1867
- Order of St. Anne 1st degree, 1867
- Order of St. Stanislaus 2nd degree, 1867
- Gold Sword for Bravery (1869)
- Montenegrin Medal (1878)
- Order of St. George, 3rd class, 1878
- Order of St Vladimir, 3rd degree, 1878
- Order of St. Stanislaus 1st degree 1878.
- Order of the Crown, with star (Prussia), 1878
- Order of St. Anne 1st degree 1881
- Order of the Crown of Italy, Officer's Cross 1882 (Italy)
- Order of St Vladimir, 2nd degree, 1888
- Order of the White Eagle, 1896
- Order of St. Alexander Nevsky, 1905
