= Rudolf Reiman =

Estonian poet, writer, and educator (1893–1957)

- Born: October 25, 1893; Mõdriku, Governorate of Estonia, Russian Empire
- Died: October 6, 1957 (aged 63); Mõdriku, then part of Estonian SSR, Soviet Union
- Occupations: Poet; writer; educator

Rudolf Reiman (also Rudolf Reimann; October 25, 1893 – October 6, 1957) was an Estonian poet, writer, and educator.

== Life ==
Rudolf Reiman was born in Mõdriku in the Governorate of Estonia, Russian Empire. He studied to be a teacher at the school in Rakvere, and he then worked as a teacher in various places from 1911 onward. From 1922 to 1930, he worked as an Estonian language teacher at Võru Teacher Training College. In addition to writing fiction (poetry and plays), he also published several textbooks, reading materials, and methodology manuals for schools.

== Works ==
=== Poetry ===
- 1914: Lambi valgel
- 1918: Vaikus
- 1922: Päikeseratas
- 1925: Läbi öö
- 2014: Sinivalge öö

=== Short stories ===
- 1939: Lunastus
- 1940: Põgenemine

=== Plays ===
- 1925: Painaja
- 1934: Jõulutäht

== Awards ==
- 1945: Honored Teacher of the Estonian SSR
