= Nikolai Protopopov =

Russian military leader

Nikolai Ivanovich Protopopov
- Born: 17 November 1853
- Died: Unknown
- Allegiance: Russian Empire
- Branch: Imperial Russian Army
- Commands: 31st Infantry Division (Russian Empire); 10th Army Corps (Russian Empire)
- Battles / wars: Russo-Turkish War; World War I

Nikolai Ivanovich Protopopov (Russian: Николай Иванович Протопопов; 17 November 1853 – unknown) was a Russian military leader. General from Infantry (1916). Hero of the First World War. Member of the Russian-Turkish war.

== Biography ==
Educated at the Imperial Konstantinovsky land surveying institute. In 1872 he entered the service as a cadet at the Nikolaev Engineering School. In 1875, he was released as second lieutenant to the 1st Caucasian Engineer Battalion. In 1877 he was promoted to lieutenant. Member of the Russian-Turkish war.

In 1881 he was promoted to headquarters captain. In 1887, after graduating from the Nikolaev Academy of the General Staff, he was promoted to captain in the 1st category. Since 1888, the senior adjutant of the headquarters of the 37th Infantry Division. Since 1891, an officer for assignments at the headquarters of the Guard Troops and the St. Petersburg Military District. In 1892, he was promoted to lieutenant colonel of the General Staff and appointed headquarters officer for special assignments at the headquarters of the 1st Army Corps. Since 1894, the head officer in command of the 50th Infantry Reserve Brigade.

In 1896 he was promoted to colonel. In 1897, he served the qualification command of a battalion in the 200th Infantry Alexander Nevsky Regiment. Since 1902, a military agent in Bulgaria.

In 1903 he was promoted to major general. Since 1904, the District Quartermaster General of the Headquarters of the Vilnius Military District. Since 1907, an assistant to the head of the Main Directorate of Cossack troops for the military unit. In 1909 he was promoted to lieutenant general with the appointment of chief of staff of the Moscow military district. Since 1912, the head of the 31st Infantry Division.

Member of the First World War, commander of the 10th Army Corps. On September 25, 1914, he was awarded the Order of St. George, 4th degree:

- "For the difference in cases against the German enemy army"

In 1916 he was promoted to general from infantry with the appointment of assistant commander of the troops of the Moscow Military District. In 1917 he was dismissed with a uniform and pension.

== Awards ==
- Order of St. Stanislav 3rd degree with swords and bow (1878)
- Order of St. Anne of the 4th degree “For Courage” (1877)
- Order of St. Anne of the 3rd degree with swords and bow (1877)
- Order of St. Vladimir of the 4th degree with swords and bow (1877)
- Order of St. Stanislav 2nd degree with swords (1878)
- Order of St. Anne of the 2nd degree (1889)
- Order of St. Vladimir 3rd degree (1899)
- Order of St. Stanislav 1st degree (1905)
- Order of St. Anne 1st Class (1909)
- Order of St. Vladimir, 2nd degree (1913)
- Order of St. George 4th degree (1914)
- Order of the White Eagle with swords (1915)
- Order of St. Alexander Nevsky with swords (1916)

== Literature ==
- Volkov S.V. - M .: Tsentrpoligraf, 2009. - T. 2: L — I. - S. 690. - ISBN 978-5-227-02055-0 .;
- Ponomarev V. P., Shabanov V. M. “Cavaliers of the Imperial Order of St. Alexander Nevsky, 1725-1917”: a bio-bibliographic dictionary in three volumes. Volume 3. - M., 2009. - S. 315–316. - ISBN 978-5-89577-145-7
- Shabanov V. M. “Military Order of the Holy Great Martyr and Victorious George. Nominal lists 1769-1920. Bibliographic reference. " M., 2004;

== Sources ==
- "Протопопов Николай Иванович". Список генералам по старшинству. Составлен по 15-е апреля 1914 года. СПб.: Военная типография. 1914. p. 279.
- "Протопопов Николай Иванович // Биографический словарь". Высшие чины Российской Империи (22.10.1721—2.03.1917). Vol. 2. Москва: [сост. Е. Л. Потёмкин] типография. 2017.
- Протопопов Николай Иванович Русская армия в Первой мировой войне

Preceded by	Commander of the 31st Infantry Division; 1912-1914	Succeeded by
Preceded by Thadeus von Sivers	Commander of the 10th Army Corps; 1914-1916	Succeeded by Nikolai Danilov
