= Alexander von Kaulbars =

Baltic German military leader

Freiherr Alexander von Kaulbars
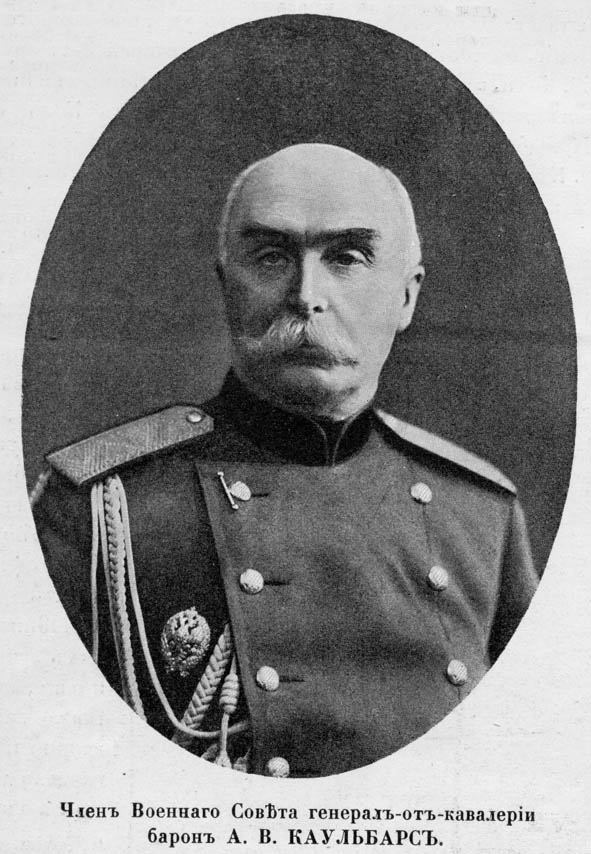
- General Alexander von Kaulbars
- Born: 23 May [O.S. 11] 1844; Mödders Manor, Mödders, Kreis Wierland, Governorate of Estonia, Russian Empire
- Died: 25 January 1929 (aged 84); Paris, French Third Republic
- Burial place: Sainte-Geneviève-des-Bois Russian Cemetery
- Other name: Alexander Vasilyevich Kaulbars
- Military career
- Allegiance: Russian Empire
- Branch: Imperial Russian Army
- Service years: 1861–1916
- Rank: General of the Cavalry
- Commands: 2nd Sofia Infantry Regiment; 1st brigade, 14th Cavalry Division; War Minister of Bulgaria (1882-1883); 1st Cavalry Division; 15th Cavalry Division; 2nd Cavalry Corps; 2nd Siberian Army Corps; Odessa Military District (1904); 3rd Manchurian Army; 2nd Manchurian Army
- Conflicts: January Uprising; Russo-Turkish War; Boxer Rebellion; Russo-Japanese War; World War I Russian Civil War

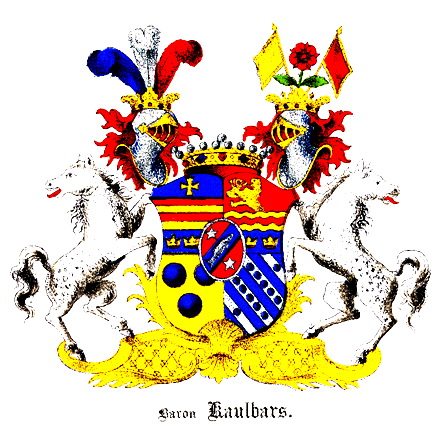
Coat of arms of the barons of the Kaulbars family of 1751, in the Baltic Coat of arms book by Carl Arvid von Klingspor in 1882.

Alexander Wilhelm Andreas Freiherr von Kaulbars (Russian: Александр Васильевич Каульбарс, romanized: Aleksandr Vasil'evič Kaul'bars; 23 May [O.S. 11] 1844 – 25 January 1929) was a Baltic German military leader who served in the Imperial Russian Army during the late 19th and early 20th centuries. A noted explorer of Central Asia, he was also regarded as one of the original organisers of the Russian Air Force.

== Biography ==
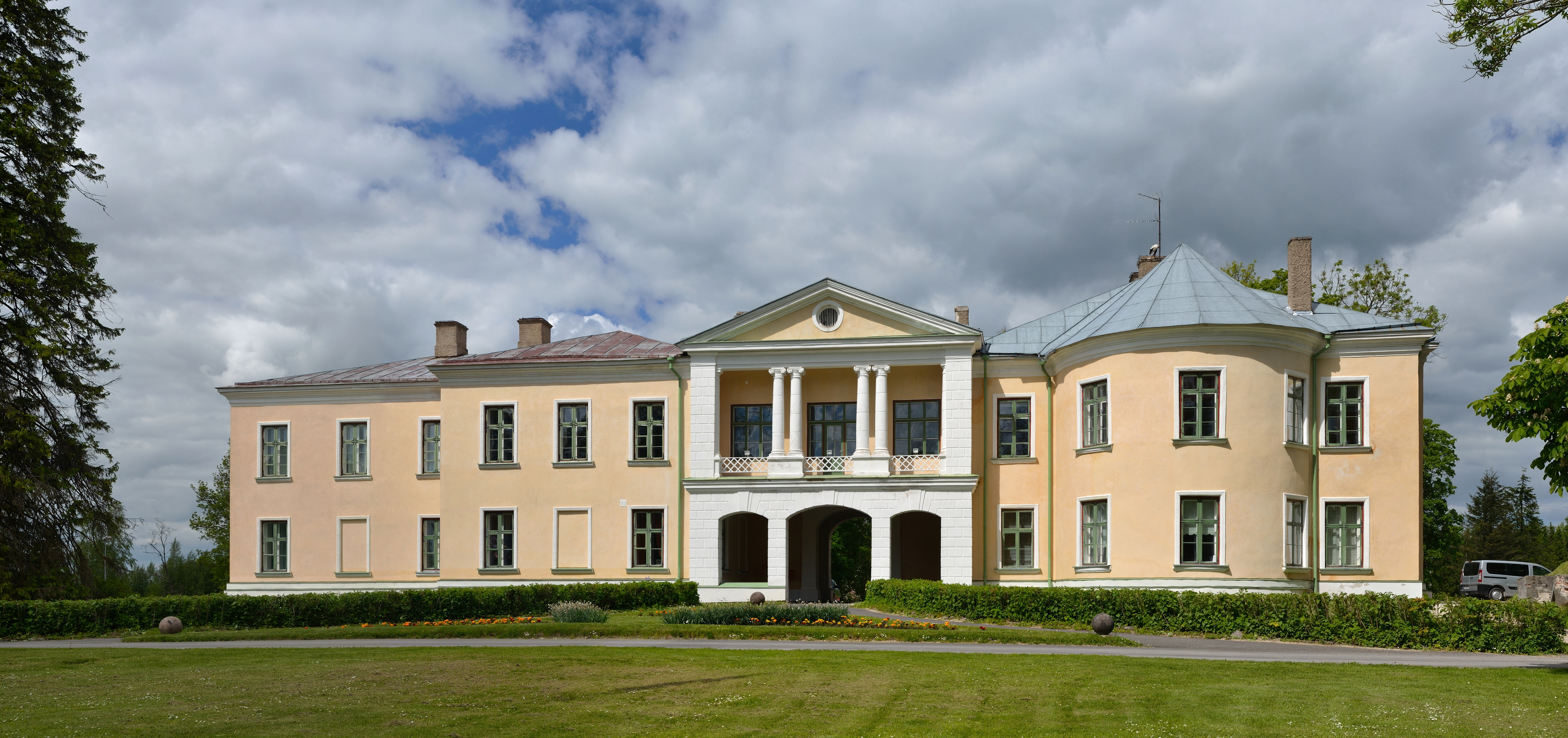
Mõdriku Mansion in present-day Estonia, where Alexander von Kaulbars was born.

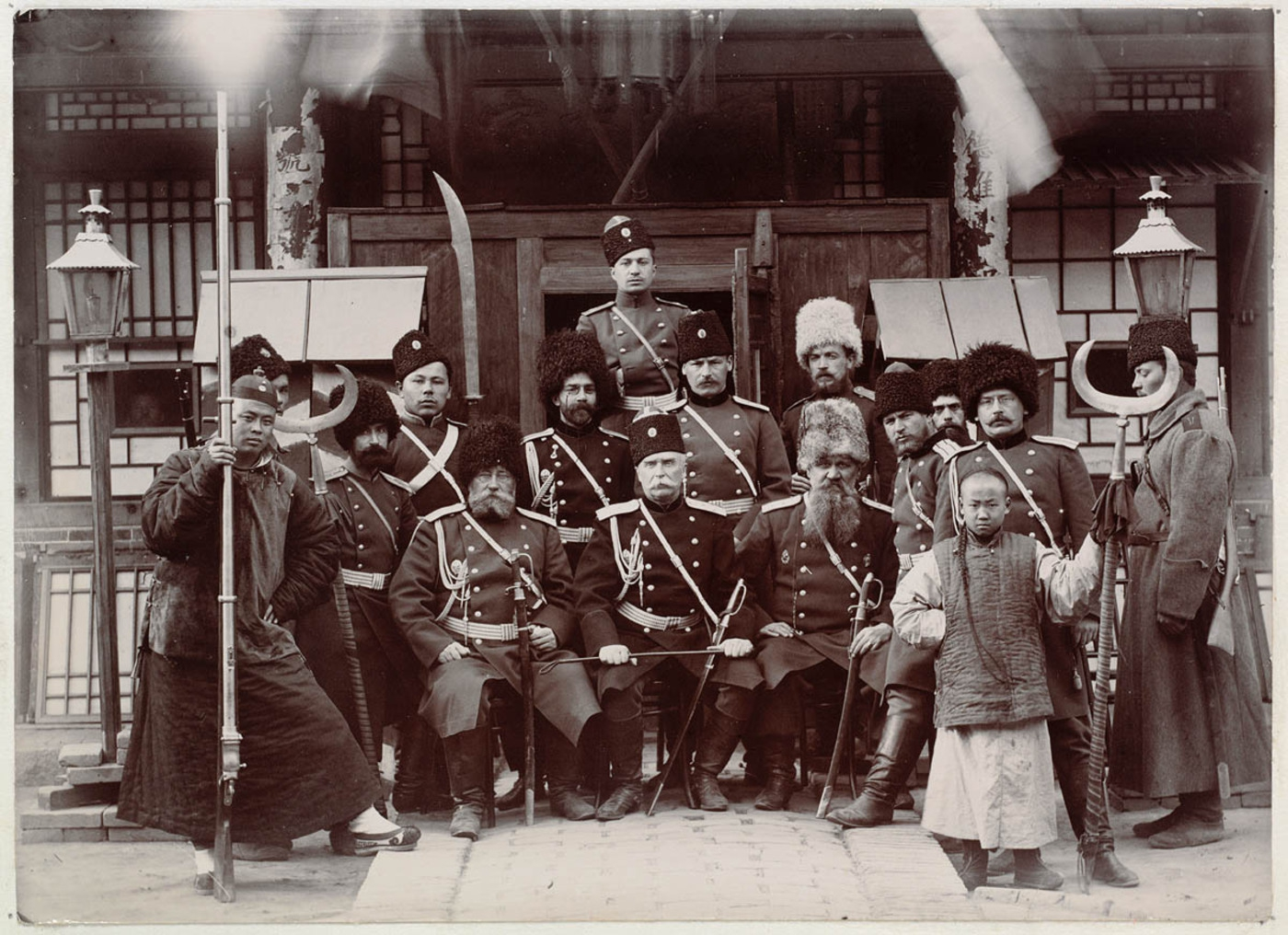
Alexander von Kaulbars during the Boxer Rebellion.

Kaulbars was born in Mödders in the Governorate of Estonia to Baron Hermann Wilhelm von Kaulbars and Alexandrine Emilie von der Oest genannt Driesen and had an older brother, Nikolai Reinhold Friedrich. Alexander and Nikolai grew up in Saint Petersburg and was of Lutheran faith. He came from the Baltic German noble Kaulbars family of Pomeranian origin. The family was of Swedish nobility. Both his father and his brother rose to the rank of general in the Imperial Russian Army. He was educated at the Nicholas Cavalry College. His first experience in combat was in 1861, while serving with the Egersky Guards Regiment in the suppression of the Polish Uprising. After graduating from the Nicholas General Staff Academy, Kaulbars was commissioned as a lieutenant, and was assigned to serve on the staff of the Turkestan Military District. He was promoted to senior aide in 1870, to the rank of lieutenant colonel in 1871, and to colonel in 1872. Soon after his arrival in Russian Turkestan, he explored the country beyond the Issyk-Kul into the Tien Shan mountains. His report was published as "Materials on the Geography of the Tien Shan", and was awarded the gold medal by the Imperial Russian Geographical Society In 1870, he explored the Russian-Chinese border, surveying the summit of Khan Tengri and looking for mountain passes into Kashgar, which he visited in 1872 for negotiations on a commercial treaty with its ruler, Yaqub Beg.

In 1873, Kaulbars participated in the Russian conquest of the Khanate of Khiva under General Konstantin Kaufman. During this expedition, he explored the delta and riverbed of the Amu Darya river, and located a navigable route to the Aral Sea. He also explored the dry riverbed of the Syr Darya, and the connections between both rivers, the Caspian Sea and Aral Sea, and the now dry Uzboy River. His research on these topics resulted in technical papers which were awarded a second gold medal by the Imperial Russian Geographical Society.

In 1874, Kaulbars was made Chief of Staff of the 8th Cavalry Division, a position which he held until his return to the General Staff in 1875. He participated in the Russo-Turkish War (1877–1878), and was promoted to major general in 1879, and given command of the 1st Brigade of the 14th Cavalry Division. From 1878 to 1879, he was a member of the committee for the demarcation of the borders of the new Kingdom of Serbia.

In 1882, Kaulbars became the Minister of War for the Principality of Bulgaria, then a client state of the Empire of Russia. This state, semi-autonomous since the Russian victory sanctioned by the Treaty of San Stefano, was fighting for independence from the Ottoman Empire. He also concurrently commanded the 1st Brigade of the 1st Cavalry Division. The following year, he became commander of the 15th Cavalry Division.

Kaulbars was promoted to lieutenant general in 1891. In 1894, he was assigned command of the 2nd Cavalry Corps. This assignment was followed by command of the 2nd Siberian Army Corps in 1900, during which time he participated in the suppression of the Boxer Rebellion and Russian occupation of Manchuria. He was further promoted to General of Cavalry in 1901 and made Assistant Commander of the Odessa Military District.

In October 1904, during the Russo-Japanese War, he became commander of the Russian 3rd Manchurian Army. Following the Battle of Sandepu, he was transferred to command the Russian 2nd Manchurian Army in February 1905. However, during the Battle of Mukden, his forces were outfought and outflanked by the Imperial Japanese Army and disintegrated in disarray. Kaulbars was wounded in a fall off his horse during the retreat. After the end of the war, he returned to command the Odessa Military District until 23 December 1909. During this period, he was noted for his strong support of the monarchy during the 1905 Russian Revolution. In December 1909, he returned to Saint Petersburg as a member of the Military Council.

In 1905 he was criticized by a government inquiry for his inaction and late response to the 1905 Odessa pogrom.

With the start of World War I, he was assigned as a commander of the Northwestern Front, and from October 1914 was placed in charge of all Russian military aviation activities. However, at the end of 1915, he was dismissed from military service. In 1916 he was appointed military governor of Odessa.

After the October Revolution, he moved to South Russia, where he joined an anti-Bolshevik Volunteer Army on 15 October 1918, despite his advanced age (then 74). He entered the reserves in 1919. With the collapse of the Armed Forces of South Russia, he was evacuated to Constantinople, and subsequently lived in exile in Bulgaria and France. He worked as an employee of a telegraph company in Paris until his death in 1929. His grave is at the Sainte-Geneviève-des-Bois Russian Cemetery.

== Honors ==
- Order of St. Stanislaus 2nd class, 1870
- Order of St Vladimir, 4th class with swords and bow, 1871
- Order of St. Anne 2nd class, 1872
- Golden Sword of St George, 1874.
- Order of St Vladimir, 3rd class with swords, 1877
- Order of St. Stanislaus 1st class, 1882
- Order of St. Anne 1st class with sword, 1886
- Order of St Vladimir, 2nd class, 1890
- Order of the White Eagle, with swords, 1898
- , Order of St. Alexander Nevsky, 1901, with diamonds, 12 June 1907
- Order of St Vladimir, 1st class, 12 June 1914

== See also ==
- List of Baltic German explorers

== Notes ==
Political offices
Preceded by Ivan Lesovoy	Minister of War of Bulgaria; 3 July 1882 – 19 September 1883	Succeeded by Aleksandr Roediger
