= 15th Infantry Division (Russian Empire) =

- 15-я пехотная дивизия
- Active: 1806 – c. 1918
- Country: Russian Empire
- Branch: Russian Imperial Army
- Role: Infantry
- Garrison/HQ: Odessa
- Engagements: World War I

The 15th Infantry Division (Russian: 15-я пехо́тная диви́зия, 15-ya pekhotnaya diviziya) was an infantry formation of the Russian Imperial Army that existed in various formations from the early 19th century until the end of World War I and the Russian Revolution. The division was based in Odessa in the years leading up to 1914. It fought in World War I and was demobilized in 1918.

== Organization ==
The 15th Infantry Division was part of the 8th Army Corps. Its order of battle in 1914 was as follows:

- 1st Brigade (HQ Mykolaiv)
  - 57th Modlin Infantry Regiment
  - 58th Prague Infantry Regiment
- 2nd Brigade (HQ Odessa)
  - 59th Lublin Infantry Regiment
  - 60th Zamosc Infantry Regiment
- 15th Artillery Brigade

== Commanders (Division Chiefs) ==
- 1840-1851: Peter Andreivich Dannenberg
- 1854-1856: Nikolai Engelhardt
- 1896-1900: Vladimir Nikolayevich Filipov
- 1905: Nikolai Martinovich Ivanov
- 1909: Dmitry Nikolaevich Bezradetsky
- 1915-1917: Pyotr Lomnovsky

== Chiefs of Staff ==
- 1860-1863: Johan Ehrnrooth
- 1885-1889: Dejan Subotić
- 1903-1905: Maciej Sulkiewicz
- 1909: Alexander Pavlovich Khanukov
- January-April 1917: Mikhail Drozdovsky
- April 1917-March 1918: Evgeny Messner

== Commanders of the 1st Brigade ==
- 1905: Sergei Petrovich Nekrasov
- 1909: Stanislav Abakanovich

== Commanders of the 2nd Brigade ==
- 1905: Mikhail Golembatovsky
- 1909: Polikarp Kuznetsov
