= 49th Army Corps =

- Country: Russian Empire
- Allegiance: Imperial Russian Army
- Engagements: First World War

The 49th Army Corps was an Army corps in the Imperial Russian Army during the First World War.

== Part of ==
- 11th Army: From 19 June 1917
- 12th Army: 12 November 1917 – December 1917

== Commanders ==
- Vladimir Selivachyov: April 1917 – July 1917
- S. N. Liupov: July 1917 – September 1917
- N. A. Savielev: From September 1917
