= 3rd Manchurian Army =

- Active: December 1904 – February 1906
- Country: Russian Empire
- Type: Army
- Engagements: Russo-Japanese War Battle of Mukden Battle of Sandepu

Commanders
- Notable commanders: See list

The 3rd Manchurian Army (Russian: 3-й Маньчжурская армия / 3 МА) was a field army of the Russian Empire that was established in 1904 during the Russo-Japanese War, to operate in Manchuria against Japan. It was one of the three such armies that were created and was disbanded in February 1906.

== History ==
After the lost Battle of Liaoyang, Tsar Nicholas II of Russia decided to disband the "Manchurian Army", that encompassed all units of the Russian Imperial Army formations operating in the region against the Imperial Japanese Army under just one commander, and split it up in the 1st, 2nd, and 3rd Manchurian Armies.

The 3rd Manchurian Army was created in December 1904 under command of General Alexander von Kaulbars. It counted 72 Battalions, 19 Squadrons, 266 guns and a total of 56,773 men. On February 12, 1905, General Alexander Bilderling took over command of the Army, followed by Mikhail Batyanov in May 1905. It participated in the Battle of Sandepu and Battle of Mukden.

After the end of the War, the 3rd Manchurian Army was disbanded in February 1906.

== Order of battle ==
The 3rd Manchurian Army consisted of the following units :

- 5th Siberian Army Corps
  - 54th Infantry Division
  - 71st Infantry Division
- 6th Siberian Army Corps
  - 55th Infantry Division
  - 72nd Infantry Division
- 16th Army Corps
  - 25th Infantry Division
  - 41st Infantry Division
- 17th Army Corps
  - 3rd Infantry Division
  - 35th Infantry Division

== Commanders ==
The formation was commanded by :

- 12.1904-12.02.1905 : General Alexander von Kaulbars
- 12.02.1905-05.1905 : General Alexander Bilderling.
- 05.1905-02.1906 : General Mikhail Batyanov
