= Mõdriku =

Village in Estonia

- Village
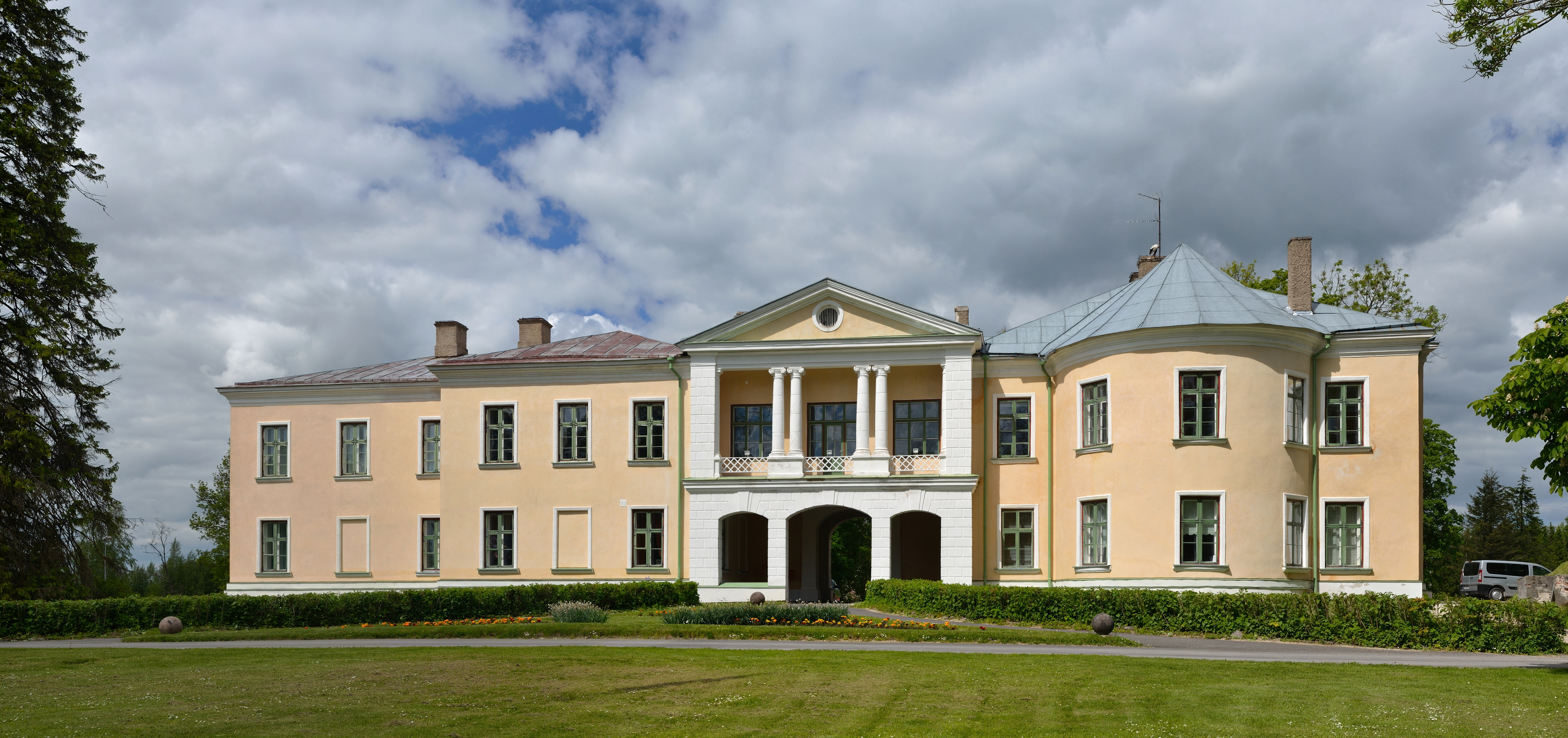
- Mõdriku Manor

- Location in Estonia
- Coordinates: 59°18′21″N 26°27′14″E
- Country: Estonia
- County: Lääne-Viru County
- Parish: Vinni Parish
- Time zone: UTC+2 (EET)
  - Summer (DST): UTC+3 (EEST)

Mõdriku is a village in Vinni Parish, Lääne-Viru County, in northeastern Estonia.

== Mõdriku Manor ==
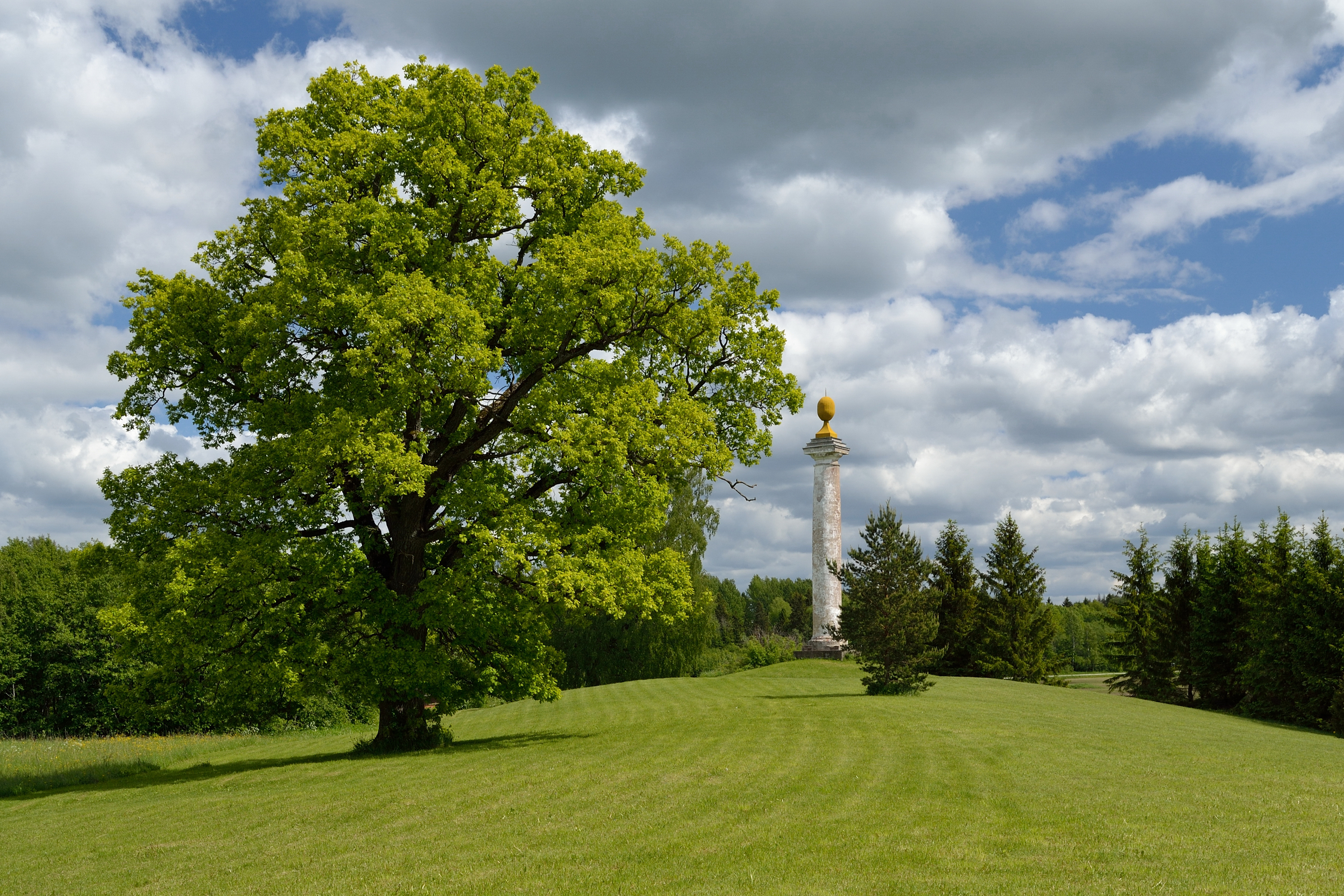
The manor park with the 1812 French–Russian War commemorative column

Mõdriku Manor (German: Mödders) was first mentioned in 1470. Over the centuries, it was the property of various Baltic German families. During the 20th century, it was used by various schools. The building traces its oldest parts to the 17th century, but has been extensively enlarged and rebuilt both during the 1780s and 1890s.

The manor was the home of several successive generations of the von Kaulbars family, including Russian general and explorer Alexander von Kaulbars. His ancestor R. A. von Kaulbars, reputedly a great patriot, put up the column commemorating the French–Russian War of 1812 that is still visible in the manor park.

== Notable people ==
Notable people that were born or lived in Mõdriku include the following:

- Rudolf Reiman (1893–1957), Estonian poet, writer, and educator
