= Richard Connaughton =

British Army officer and author

Richard Michael Connaughton (born 20 January 1942) is a British Army officer and author specialised in military history.

== Life ==
Connaughton was educated at Duke of York's Royal Military School in Dover, Kent and the Royal Military Academy Sandhurst. He served in the British Army for more than 30 years, where he specialised in military logistics. Connaughton was stationed in East Asia at the Brigade of Gurkhas, before being seconded to Germany and Northern Ireland. Connaughton was an instructor at the Army Staff College Camberley and at the Australian Command and Staff College. After two years of service as head of Defence Studies of the British Army he voluntarily resigned from active service in the rank of a colonel.

Since the mid-1980s, Connaughton has written on military history, e.g. on subjects such as the Russian-Japan War, Admiral Alexander Kolchak's service during the Russian Civil War or General Douglas MacArthur's escape from the Philippines.

Connaughton is an elected Fellow of the Institute of Management (1983) and Fellow of the Chartered Institute of Transport (1989). From 1989 to 1990 he undertook a Defence Fellowship at the University of Cambridge. In 1992 Connaughton became Research Fellow of the Centre for Defence and International Security Studies (CDISS) of Lancaster University. He holds a Master of Philosophy (M.Phil. Cantab) in International Relations from the University of Cambridge and a Ph.D. in Politics of Lancaster University.

Connaughton is married to Annis Rosemary Georgina Best since 1971. He has a son (born 1972) and a daughter (born 1974).

== Work ==
- The War of the Rising Sun and Tumbling Bear: A Military History of the Russo-Japanese War, 1904–05. London, New York, Routledge, 1988, ISBN 978-0415071437.
  - (revised edition) Rising Sun and Tumbling Bear: Russia's War with Japan. London, Cassell, 2003, ISBN 978-0304361847.
- The Republic of the Ushakovka: Admiral Kolchak and the Allied Intervention in Siberia, 1918–20. London, New York, Routledge, 1990, ISBN 978-0415051989.
- Military Intervention in the 1990s: A New Logic of War. London, New York, Routledge, 1992.
- Swords and Ploughshares: Coalition Operations, the Nature of Future Conflict and the United Nations: A Paper. Camberley, Strategic and Combat Studies Institute, 1993.
- Shrouded Secrets: Japan's War on Mainland Australia, 1942–1944. London, Washington D.C., Brassey's, 1994, ISBN 978-1857531602.
- The Battle for Manila. Novato, CA, Presidio, 1995, ISBN 978-0891415787.
- The Nature of Future Conflict. London, Leo Cooper, 1995, ISBN 978-0850524604.
- Celebration of Victory, V-E Day 1945. London, Washington D.C., Brassey's, 1995, ISBN 978-1857531817.
- Descent Into Chaos: The Doomed Expedition to Low's Gully. London, Washington D.C., Brassey's, 1996, ISBN 978-1857531473.
- Military Support and Protection for Humanitarian Assistance: Rwanda, April – December 1994. Camberley, Strategic and Combat Studies Institute, 1996.
- MacArthur and Defeat in the Philippines. Woodstock, New York, Overlook Press, 2001, ISBN 978-1585671182.
- Military Intervention and Peacekeeping: The Reality. Aldershot, Hampshire, England; Burlington, Vermont, Ashgate, 2001, ISBN 978-0754618027.
- Omai: The Prince Who Never Was. London, Timewell Press, 2005, ISBN 978-1857252057.
- A Brief History of Modern Warfare. London, Robinson, Philadelphia, Running Press, 2008, ISBN 978-0762433919.
- A Dorset Parish Remembers 1914-1919, (Editor), Milton Mill Publishing, 2014, ISBN 978-0-9540570-3-9.
- A Dorset Parish Remembers 1939-1945, (Editor), Milton Mill Publishing, 2015, ISBN 978-0-9540570-4-6.
