= 31st Infantry Division (Russian Empire) =

- 31-я пехотная дивизия
- Active: 1914–1918
- Country: Russian Empire
- Branch: Russian Imperial Army
- Role: Infantry

The 31st Infantry Division (Russian: 31-я пехо́тная диви́зия, 31-ya Pekhotnaya Diviziya) was an infantry formation of the Russian Imperial Army.

== Organization ==
The 31st Infantry Division was part of the 10th Army Corps.

- 1st Brigade
  - 121st Infantry Regiment
  - 122nd Infantry Regiment
- 2nd Brigade
  - 123rd Infantry Regiment
  - 124th Infantry Regiment
- 31st Artillery Brigade

== Commanders ==
- 1912-1914: Nikolai Protopopov

== Chiefs of Staff ==
- 1899-1901: Vladislav Klembovsky

== Commanders of the 2nd Brigade ==
- 1901-1903: Leonid Artamonov
- February 11-May 6, 1917: Oleksander Osetsky
