= Östra Eneby socken =

Coordinates: 58.6097°N 16.1364°E

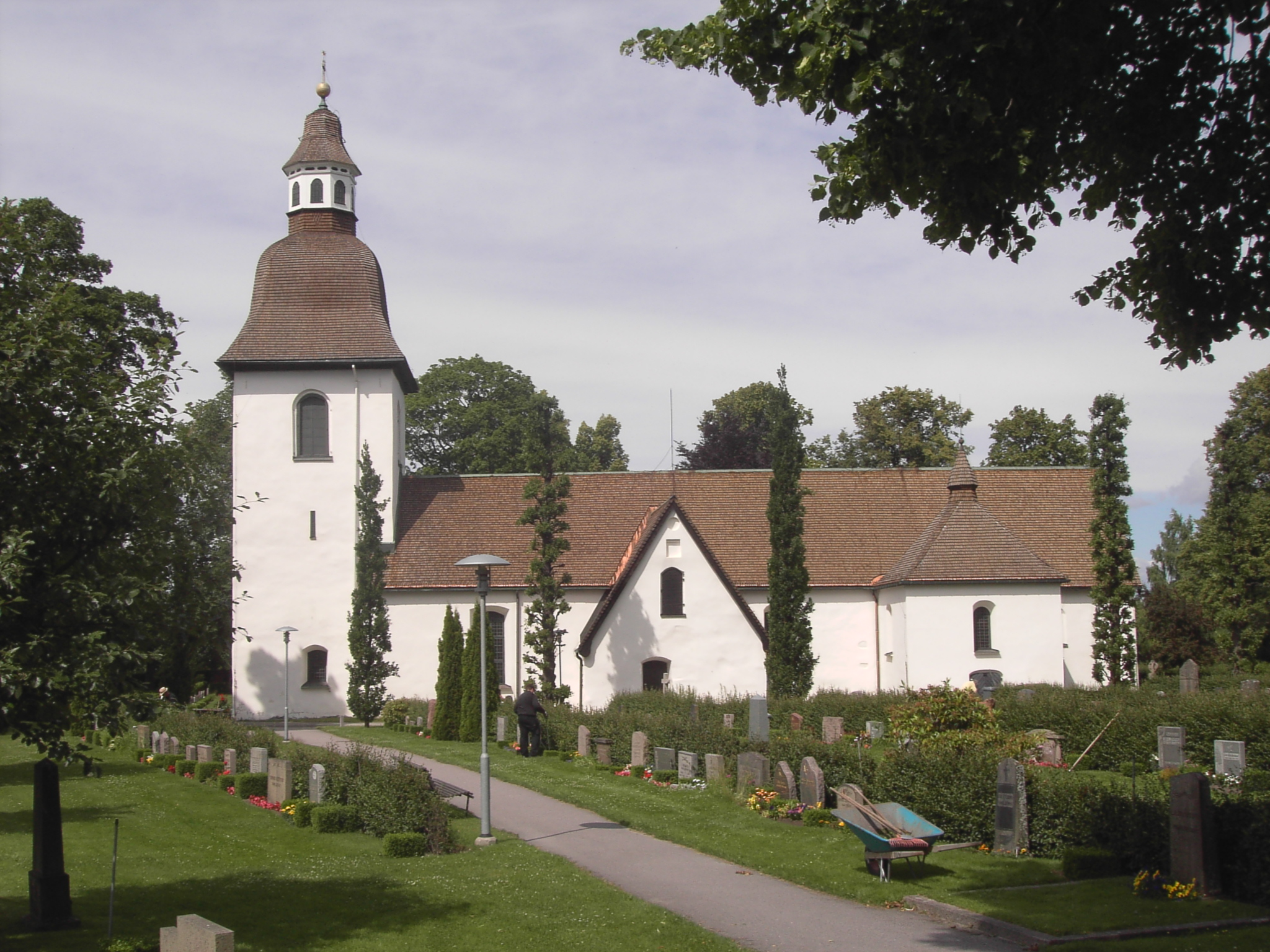
The Östra Eneby parish church, in southern Sweden.

Östra Eneby socken is a former socken of Bråbo Hundred in Östergötland, Sweden. It was formerly a separate parish in Brabo County of Östergötland and the Linköping diocese, in southern Sweden, but in 1916, it was incorporated into the city of Norrköping and became one of the city's parishes.

In 1920, it began to be called Norrköping Östra Eneby Assembly. Early, it had tram connections to East Eneby and even now turning line 2 at the parish church begun in the 12th century. Surrounding the well-preserved early medieval church, with murals, are older school buildings and two mid-19th century manbyggnader - a parsonage and Eneby Norrgård.

In Östra Eneby is also the Eneby center and a school including high school classes, named Eneby School. Within the parish, a major part of the Swedish rock carvings are concentrated, particularly in Himmelstalund.

There is also a cemetery at the church (see photo).
