= Vladimir Selivachyov =

Russian and Soviet general (1868–1919)

- Владимир Иванович Селивачёв
- Born: 14 June 1868; Novgorod Governorate, Russian Empire
- Died: 17 September 1919 (aged 51); Kursk, Russian SFSR
- Education: Pavel Military School; Nicholas General Staff Academy
- Military career
- Allegiance: Russian Empire (until 1918); Russian Soviet Federative Socialist Republic (1918–1919)
- Branch: Imperial Russian Army; Red Army
- Service years: 1886–1919
- Rank: Lieutenant general
- Units: 147th Samara Infantry Regiment; 88th Petrovsk Infantry Regiment
- Commands: 49th Army Corps (1917); 7th Army (1917); Selivachyov Group, Southern Front (1919)
- Conflicts: Russo-Japanese War; World War I; Eastern Front; Kerensky Offensive; Russian Civil War; Counteroffensive of Southern Front

Vladimir Ivanovich Selivachyov (Russian: Владимир Иванович Селивачёв; 14 June 1868 – 17 September 1919) was a lieutenant general of the Imperial Russian Army during World War I who became a commander of the Red Army in the Russian Civil War.

== Biography ==
He belonged to the nobility of Novgorod Governorate. His father was Captain Ivan D. Selivachyov (1826-1870). He studied at the Pavel Military School and the Nicholas General Staff Academy. He joined the 147th Samara Infantry Regiment. He participated in the Russo-Japanese War from 1904 to 1905, as commander of the 3rd Battalion of the 88th Petrovsk Infantry Regiment. In 1906 he was promoted to lieutenant-colonel.

During the First World War, he was appointed lieutenant-general on 22 October 1916. After the Russian revolution in February in March 1917 he was appointed commander of the 49th Army Corps, which was part of the 11th Army. During the Kerensky Offensive he became commander of the 7th Army. On 2 September 1917 he was arrested by a committee of the army. On 9 September 1917 he was fired and imprisoned in Berdychiv Prison, but 2 days later he was released and enlisted in the reserve of the Kiev military headquarters. On 29 January 1918, he was dismissed from military service for health reasons.

In December 1918, he was enlisted in the Red Army and became a member of the commission for the study and use of the experience of war. In 1919, he spent several months in prison charged with membership of a clandestine organization. In August–September 1919 he became assistant to the commander of the Southern Front, simultaneously commanding the Selivachyov Group, composed of the 8th Army, 3rd and 42nd Rifle Divisions of the 13th Army.

He participated in the Counteroffensive of Southern Front, but was stopped by Denikin's White forces and forced to retreat.

He died a few days later on 17 September 1919 of typhoid or due to poisoning.
