= 10th Army Corps (Russian Empire) =

- Active: 1813-1918
- Country: Russian Empire; Russian Republic
- Branch: (Russian Empire) Imperial Russian Army
- Size: ~20,000
- HQ: Kharkov
- Engagements: World War I; Gorlice–Tarnów Offensive

The 10th Army Corps was an Army corps in the Imperial Russian Army.

== Composition ==
The 10th Army Corps was composed of the 9th Infantry Division, 31st Infantry Division and the 10th Cavalry Division.

== Part of ==
- 3rd Army: 1914-1916
- 4th Army: 1916
- 2nd Army: 1916-1917
- 10th Army: 1917
- 9th Army: 1917

== Commanders ==
- 1813-1815: Peter Kaptzevich
- 1876-1878: Semyon Vorontsov
- 1878-1879: Vasily Fedorovich Rall
- 1889-1890: Victor Deziderjevitch Dandevill
- 1890-1901: Victor Fedorovitch Winberg
- 1901-1904: Kapiton Konstantinovitch Slutchevsky
- 1904-1905: Konstantin Tserpitsky
- 1906-1907: Pavel Alexandrovich Layming
- 1907-1911: Yakov Zhilinsky
- 1911-1914: Thadeus von Sivers
- 1914-1916: Nikolai Protopopov
- 1916-1917: Nikolai Danilov
- 1917: Januariusz Cichowicz
