= Evgeny Messner =

Russian soldier (1891–1974)

Evgeny Eduardovich Messner (Russian: Евгений Эдуардович Месснер, German: Eugen Messner; 1891–1974) was a Russian professional soldier and military theorist. A Russian German, he became an officer of the Imperial Russian Army. During the Russian Civil War he sided with the White movement and fought against the Bolsheviks, notably as the last chief of staff of Kornilov Division of the Army of General Wrangel.

After the war, Messner fled to Yugoslavia as one of notable White émigrées. He settled in Belgrade where he remained an active member of the Russian All-Military Union and a professor at the Higher Military Courses of Belgrade. During World War II, as an ardent anti-communist he sided with the Axis powers and the Russian Liberation Movement, and briefly served in the propaganda services of the Wehrmacht as head of the Russian section. In early 1945, Messner returned to active front-line service as a Major in Boris Smyslovsky's 1st Russian National Army. Through Liechtenstein Messner and his family moved in 1947 to Argentina, where he continued his earlier work as a journalist, publisher, writer and military theorist.

Messner's most well-known publication, "Mutiny, or the name of the Third World War" (Russian: Мятеж — имя третьей всемирной), published in 1960, predicted that the future wars would be waged by small terrorist cells and special forces, gaining influence by subversion and organised revolutions rather than through traditional warfare.

Messner died in Buenos Aires in 1974 and was buried at the British Cemetery there.
