= 1st Manchurian Army =

- Active: 28 October 1904 – 12 February 1906
- Country: Russian Empire
- Type: Army
- Engagements: Russo-Japanese War Battle of Mukden Battle of Sandepu

Commanders
- Notable commanders: See list

Insignia
- Abbreviation: 1 MA

The 1st Manchurian Army (Russian: 1-я Маньчжурская армия / 1 МА) was a field army of the Russian Empire that was established in 1904 during the Russo-Japanese War, for the purposes of operating in the Manchuria region against Japan. It was one of the three such armies that were created and was involved in every major engagement.

== History ==
It was formed in October–November 1904, from the basis of the Manchurian Army that had existed until September of that year, which had been dissolved after the Battle of Liaoyang. The previous "Manchurian Army" was a term that encompassed all units of the Russian Imperial Army formations operating in the region against the Imperial Japanese Army. It consisted of the following formations: 1st Siberian Army Corps primarily as the southern detachment and the 3rd Siberian Army Corps primarily as the eastern. In September 1904, that army was officially disbanded by order of Emperor Nicholas II and replaced by the 1st, 2nd, and 3rd Manchurian Armies.

== Order of battle ==
The 1st Manchurian Army consisted of the following units, as of January 1905.

- 1st Army Corps
  - 22nd Infantry Division
  - 37th Infantry Division
- 2nd Siberian Army Corps
  - 6th Siberian Rifle Division
  - 8th Siberian Rifle Division
- 3rd Siberian Army Corps
  - 4th Siberian Rifle Division
  - 7th Siberian Rifle Division
- 4th Siberian Army Corps
  - 2nd Siberian Rifle Division
  - 3rd Siberian Rifle Division

== Commanders ==
The formation was commanded by the following officers until its dissolution.

1st Manchurian Army
From	Commander	Previously
28 October 1904	General of Infantry Nikolai Linevich	Manchurian Army
15 March 1905	General of Infantry Alexei Kuropatkin	War Ministry

=== Chief of Staff ===
- 28.10.1904-17.03.1905 : Lieutenant-General V. I. Kharkevich.
- 24.03.1905-18.04.1906 : Lieutenant General Aleksei Evert.
