= 8th Army Corps (Russian Empire) =

- Active: 1813-1918
- Country: Russian Empire; Russian Republic
- Branch: (Russian Empire) Imperial Russian Army
- Size: ~20,000
- HQ: Odessa
- Engagements: War of the Sixth Coalition; Battle of Leipzig; Russo-Turkish War (1877–78); First World War

The 8th Army Corps was an Army corps in the Imperial Russian Army.

== Composition ==
In July 1914:

- 14th Infantry Division
- 15th Infantry Division
- 8th Cavalry Division
- 4th Rifle Brigade
- 8th Howitzer Artillery Battalion
- 11th Sapper Battalion
- Odessa Marine Battalion

== Part of ==
- 8th Army: 2 August 1914 – 15 September 1915
- 11th Army: From 20 June 1916
- Russian Special Army: 1 October 1916 – 28 October 1916
- 9th Army: From 1 November 1916
- 4th Army: 22 December 1916 – December 1917

== Commanders ==
- Fyodor Radetzky: 1877 – 1878
- Radko Dimitriev: 1914
- Vladimir Dragomirov: 1915 – 1916
- Anton Denikin: 1916 – 1917
