= Battle of Sandepu =

Battle of the Russo-Japanese War

Coordinates: 41°47′N 123°26′E

- Part of the Russo-Japanese War
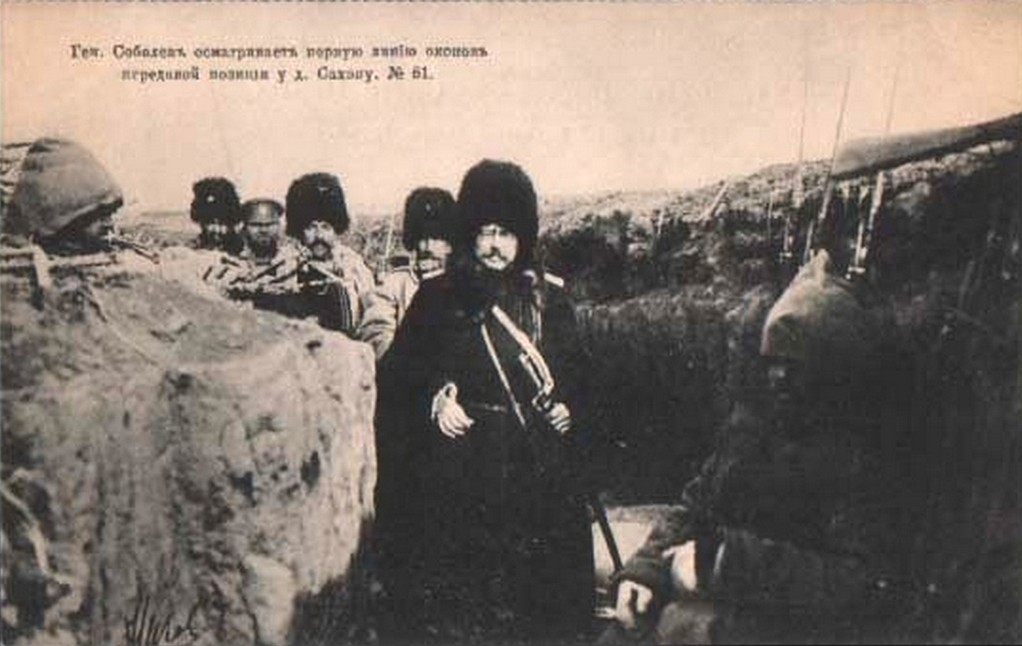
- Contemporary Russian postcard
Date	25 January – 29 January 1905
Location	South of Mukden, Manchuria
Result	Inconclusive

Belligerents
Empire of Japan	Russian Empire

Commanders and leaders
Ōyama Iwao; Oku Yasukata; Tatsumi Naofumi	Aleksey Kuropatkin; Oskar Grippenberg

Units involved
Second Army	Second Manchurian Army

Strength
40,000	75,000

Casualties and losses
9,511: 1,848 killed; 7,421 wounded; 242 captured	13,963: 1,727 killed; 11,123 wounded; 1,113 MIA

The Battle of Sandepu (also known as the Battle of Heikoutai) (Japanese: 黒溝台会戦 (Kokkōdai no kaisen), Russian: Сражение при Сандепу) was a major land battle of the Russo-Japanese War. It was fought within a group of villages about 36 miles (58 km) southwest of Mukden, Manchuria.

== Background ==
After the Battle of Shaho, the Russian and Japanese forces faced each other south of Mukden until the frozen Manchurian winter began. The Russians were entrenched in the city of Mukden, while the Japanese occupied a 160-kilometer front with the Japanese 1st Army, 2nd Army, 4th Army and the Akiyama Independent Cavalry Regiment. The Japanese field commanders thought no major battle was possible and assumed that the Russians had the same view regarding the difficulty of winter combat.

The Russian commander, General Aleksey Kuropatkin was receiving reinforcements via the Trans-Siberian Railway but was concerned about the impending arrival of the battle-hardened Japanese Third Army under General Nogi Maresuke to the front after the fall of Port Arthur on 2 January 1905.

General Nikolai Linevich had joined Kuropatkin’s staff at Mukden from Vladivostok to command the 1st Manchurian Army and Kuropatkin’s left flank. The center was held by General Alexander Kaulbars’s 3rd Manchurian Army. The right flank was commanded by General Oskar Gripenberg, the inexperienced newly arrived commanding general of the 2nd Manchurian Army. The 2nd Manchurian Army consisted of the 8th European Army Corps, a division of the 10th, the 61st Reserve Division, the 5th Rifle Brigade, and the 1st Siberian Army Corps under General Baron Georgii Stackelberg, besides a large body of cavalry, or approximately, 285,000 men and 350 guns.

Gripenberg was initially pessimistic towards Kuropatkin's plans for an offensive against the Japanese left wing, which was in an exposed northern position close to Russian territory near the small village of Heikoutai. He agreed to the plan on the condition that all three Russian armies coordinate their attack. Details of the plan were leaked by St Petersburg to a war correspondent from L'Écho de Paris, who credited the plan to Gripenberg. This news article, as well as Gripenberg’s major redeployments of his forces in 14 and 16 January, signaled the Russian intentions to the Japanese.

== The Mishchenko Raid ==
Kuropatkin’s first move was to send General Pavel Mishchenko south with 6000 cavalry and six batteries of light artillery with the aim of destroying Newchang Station on the South Manchurian Railroad. The station was known to have a large stockpile of food and supplies. Mishchenko was also instructed to destroy railway bridges and sections of the train track along the way. Departing on 8 January, Mishchenko made unexpectedly slow progress due to inclement weather and the lack of forage and supplies along the way. By the time he reached the station on 12 January, it had been heavily reinforced by the Japanese. After failing to take the station in three attempts, he was forced to withdraw, returning to Mukden on 18 January. The damage made by his dragoons to the rail tracks was quickly repaired by the Japanese.

== The Battle of Sandepu ==
On 19 January, Kuropatkin issued orders for the Second Manchurian Army to attack in a maneuver to outflank General Oku's Japanese Second Army and to drive it back across the Taitzu River before Nogi's Third Army could arrive. However, Gripenberg was not allowed to commit all of his forces – Kuropatkin limited him to three divisions plus the 1st East Siberian Army Corps and cavalry. The Japanese were aware of these plans, causing Ōyama to reinforce his left flank. Kuropatkin afterwards blamed premature moves by Gripenberg for alerting the Japanese.

On 25 January 1905, the battle began with an attack by the 1st Siberian Rifle Corps on the fortified village of Heikoutai, which the Russians took with severe losses. The Russian 14th Division, which was intended to attack the fortified village of Sandepu (三界坝村), failed to coordinate its attack with the 1st Siberian, and attacked on the following day, 26 January, instead. Hampered by a lack of maps, reconnaissance and poor weather conditions, with occasional blizzards the Russians also attacked the wrong village, occupying the neighboring hamlet of Paotaitzu, which came under a strong artillery barrage and counterattack from Sandepu, which was occupied in strength by the Japanese 5th Division. Rather than come to their rescue, Gripenberg sent a false report to Kuropatkin that Sandepu had been taken, and ordered his men to rest on 27 January. However, the rest area assigned to Stackelberg's troops was in Japanese hands, and despite standing orders to the contrary, Stackelberg ordered his men to attack. After losing 6000 men, Stackelberg was forced to fall back.

By the morning of 28 January, Gripenberg found that he was separated from Kaulbars by the village of Sandepu, which prevented any attempt to link forces. However, as he still outnumbered the Japanese defenders by seven divisions to five divisions, he insisted on continuing the offensive. His decision was not supported by Kuropatkin, who acted with his usual caution and hesitation, and ordered Gripenberg's forces back. Stackelberg, again ignoring orders, continued to attack, and with the help of Mishchenko's cavalry, took part of Sandepu village. Simultaneously, the Russian 10th Army Corps under General Konstantin Tserpitsky, with Gripenberg's consent, succeeded in securing positions to the rear of Sandepu. Despite the advantageous situation, Kuropatkin then relieved Stackelberg of his command for insubordination, and again demanded that Gripenberg withdraw. Advancing Russian soldiers, their morale high as they were on what appeared to be a successful offense for the first time since the beginning of the war, could not understand the reason.

Ōyama then launched a massive counteroffensive on 29 January 1905, and succeeded in retaking Heikoutai by mid-morning.

Immediately after the battle, Gripenberg resigned his commission, claiming illness and was replaced by Kaulbars. On his return to St Petersburg, he stopped at Harbin where he bitterly blamed Kuropatkin for the debacle in the newspapers, declaring that he was a traitor and that Kuropatkin withheld crucial support due to jealousy at his success. He continued a harsh publicity campaign against Kuropatkin in the newspapers after his return to Russia. Stackelberg was also relieved of his command by Kuropatkin, and charged with insubordination.

== Results ==
Total Russian casualties at the Battle of Sandepu were 1,781 killed, 9,395 wounded and 1,065 MIA per modern Soviet sources, although other sources put the toll at over 20,000 men. Japanese casualties totaled around 9,000 with only 2,000 killed.

As the battle ended in a tactical stalemate, neither side claimed victory. In Russia, the Marxists used the newspaper controversy created by Gripenberg, and by Kuropatkin’s incompetence in previous battles, to drum up more support in their campaign against the government.
