= 5th Siberian Army Corps =

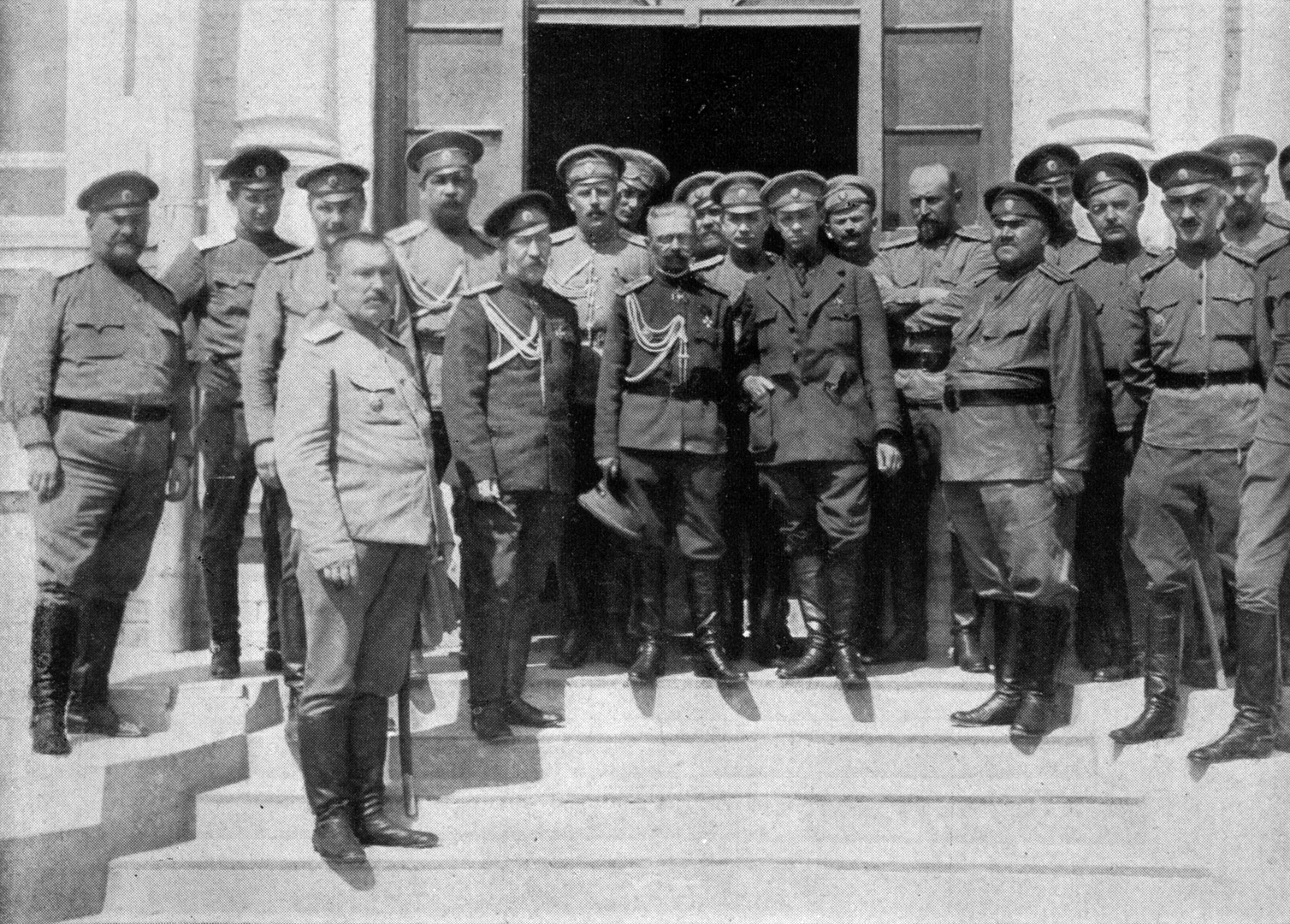
- The staff of the 5th Siberian Army Corps, 1917
- Active: 1904–1917
- Country: Russian Empire
- Branch: Russian Imperial Army
- Role: Infantry
- Engagements: Russo-Japanese War; World War I

The 5th Siberian Army Corps was an Army corps in the Imperial Russian Army.

The formation was formed, in 1904, from the 54th reserve brigade of the Kazan Military District, deployed in a corps consisting of two divisions during the Russian-Japanese war of 1904–1905. The corps staff was formed on the basis of the headquarters of the 54th reserve brigade. The corps divisions received numbers 54th and 71st infantry.

In 1910 it was re-formed.

== Composition ==
1904:

- 54th Infantry Division
- 71st Infantry Division

1914:

- 3rd Siberian Rifle Division
- 6th Siberian Rifle Division

== Part of ==
- Amur Military District: 1904–06.1914
- 1st Army: 10.1914 – 01.1915
- 2nd Army: 02.1915 – 09.1915
- 4th Army: 09.1915 – 02.1916
- 12th Army: 03.1916 – 04.1916
- 6th Army: 04.1916 – 05.1916
- 8th Army: 06.1916 – 07.1916
- 11th Army: 07.1916 – 1917

== Commanders ==
- 01.1904-05.1906: Leonid Dembowsky
- 06.1910-07.1911: Nikolai Podvalnyuk
- 09.1911-12.1913: Pavel Savvich
- 12.1913-02.1914: Arkady Sychevsky
- 02.1914-12.1914: Leonty Sidorin
- 12.1914-04.1917: Nikolai Voronov,
- 04.1917-11.1917: Alexander Turbin,
- 11.1917-02.1918: Captain Alexander Todorsky

== Sources ==
- the article in the Russian Wikipedia, 5-й Сибирский армейский корпус.
