= General Dragomirov =

General Dragomirov may refer to:

- Abram Dragomirov (1868–1955), Imperial Russian Army general of the cavalry
- Mikhail Dragomirov (1830–1905), Imperial Russian Army general of the infantry
- Vladimir Dragomirov (1862–1928), Imperial Russian Army general
