= Rittich =

Rittich, or Rittikh when transliterated from Russian, may refer to one of the following persons.

- David Rittich (born 1992), Czech ice hockey goaltender
- Eugene Rittich (1928–2006), Canadian musician
- Jenõ Rittich (born 1889), Hungarian Olympic gymnast
- Aleksandr Aleksandrovich Rittikh (1868–1930), Minister of Agriculture, Russian Empire
- Aleksandr Fyodorovich Rittikh (born 1831), military commander and ethnographer, Russian Empire
