= Leonid Dembowsky =

Russian infantry general

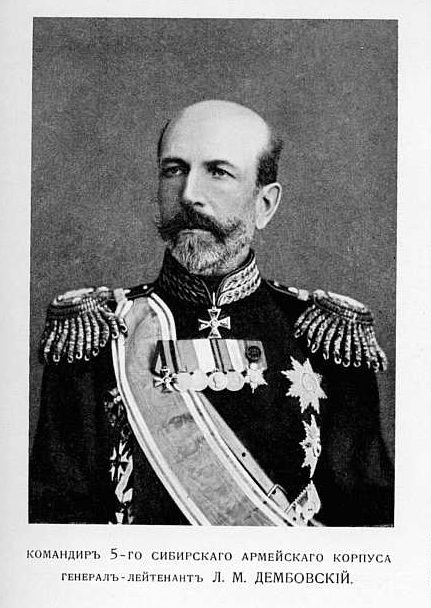
- Born: Leonid Matveyevich Dembowsky; July 11, 1838
- Died: 1908 (aged 69–70)
- Military career
- Allegiance: Russian Empire
- Branch: Imperial Russian Army
- Unit: 22nd Infantry Division (Russian Empire)
- Commands: 24th Infantry Division (Russian Empire)
- Conflicts: Russo-Japanese War

Leonid Matveyevich Dembowsky (July 11, 1838 – 1908) was a Russian infantry general (December 6, 1906), director of the Pavlovsky military school, and participant in the Russo-Japanese War of 1904-1905.

== Biography ==
Dembowsky was born to college adviser Matvey Egorovich Dembovsky.

He graduated from the 1st Moscow Cadet Corps (1857) and the Academy of the General Staff (1862, 1st rank).

He was released to the 12th Astrakhan Grenadier Regiment: company commander, battalion. From June 25, 1871 to April 16, 1872 he was the artilaryman. adjutant of the headquarters of the 7th Infantry Division, from May 6, 1872 to April 13, 1875 - st. adjutant of the headquarters of the Kharkov Military District, from June 13, 1875 - head officer for assignments at the headquarters of the Kharkov Military District. From October 15, 1876, chief of staff of the 22nd Infantry Division, from May 8, 1879, chief of staff of local troops of the St. Petersburg Military District, from October 19, 1881 - head officer for commissions at the headquarters of the Guard and St. Petersburg Military District, from January 20, 1887 - Chief of Staff of the 37th Infantry Division (Russian Empire), from 03/01/1885 - commander of the 147th Infantry Samara Regiment, from April 19, 1887 - St. Petersburg Grenadier (later Life Guards of St. Petersburg) regiment, from 04.16.1890 - chief of the 1st Pavlovsky Military School, from 12.02, 1897 the head of the 24th Infantry Division (Russian Empire), from 10.01, 1902 at the disposal of the Minister of War.

On June 1, 1904, the commander of the newly formed 5th Siberian Army Corps and for military distinctions in the Russo-Japanese war was awarded the Order of the White Eagle with a sword. and gold weapons with the words "For courage." From May 5, 1906 to September 18, 1906 - at the disposal of the Minister of War. From September 18, 1906 to April 2, 1907, he was the commander of the consolidated corps for the occupation of Manchuria.

From December 30, 1906 onwards, he was member of the Military Council.

He had two children.

== Dates of rank ==
- June 6, 1857 - lieutenant,
- 01/09, 1863 - Head Captain,
- 05/12, 1863 - captain,
- 03/12, 1867 - major,
- June 25, 1871 - captain of the General Staff,
- April 16, 1872 - lieutenant colonel,
- April 13, 1875 - Colonel,
- August 30, 1887 - Major General
- May 14, 1896 - Lieutenant General.

== Awards ==
- Order of St. Stanislav 3rd degree (1865)
- Order of St. Anna, 3rd degree (1868)
- Order of St. Stanislav 2nd degree (1871)
- Imp. crown to the Order of St. Stanislav 2nd degree (1873),
- Order of St. Anna, 2nd degree (1878)
- Order of St. Vladimir 4th degree (1881)
- Order of St. Vladimir 3rd degree (1884)
- Golden Weapon for Bravery (1905)
- Persian Order of Leo and Sun 4th degree (1878)
- Prussian Order of the Crown with a 2nd class star (1888)
- Order of the White Eagle with swords (03/26/1905)

== Sources ==
- Petrov A.N. Historical sketch of the Pavlovsky military school, Pavlovsky cadet corps and the Imperial military orphanage. 1798-1898 SPb., 1898
- List to the generals by seniority, 1.01.1908

Military offices
Preceded by Nikolay Bobrikov	Chief of Staff of the 22nd Infantry Division; 1876-1879	Succeeded by Ivan Iosifovich Yakubovsky
Preceded by	Commander of the 24th Infantry Division; 1897-1902	Succeeded by Anton Yegorovich von Saltza
