= Mikhail Batyanov =

Russian general

Mikhail Ivanovich Batyanov
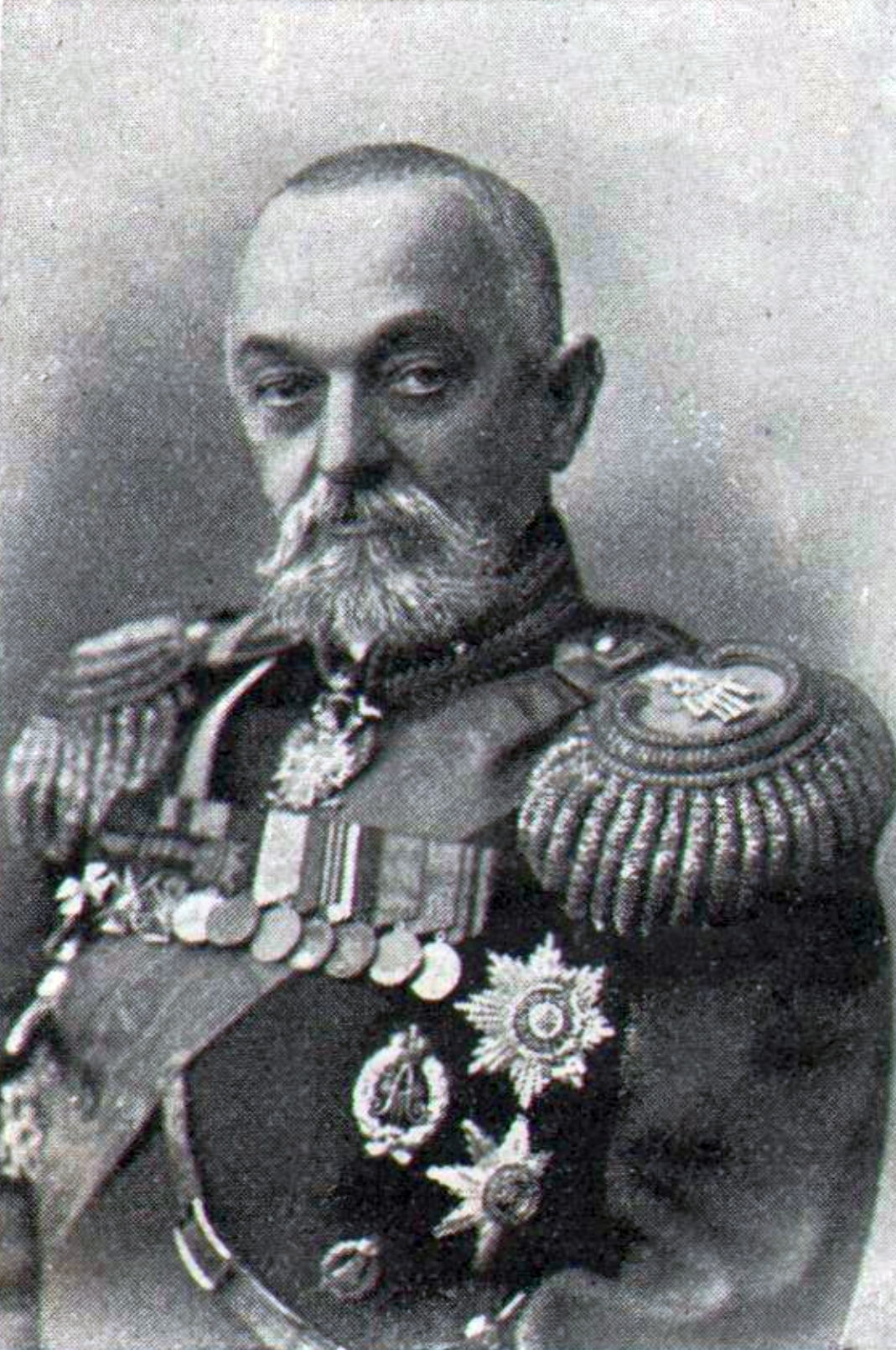
- General Mikhail Batyanov
- Born: 1835
- Died: 5 December 1916 (aged 80–81); Petrograd, Russian Empire
- Military career
- Allegiance: Russian Empire
- Branch: Imperial Russian Army
- Service years: 1852–1911
- Rank: General
- Commands: 13th Infantry Division (Russian Empire); 23rd Infantry Division (Russian Empire); 12th Army Corps; 16th European Army Corps; Third Manchurian Army
- Conflicts: Crimean War; Caucasus War; Russo-Japanese War

Mikhail Ivanovich Batyanov (Russian: Михаи́л Ива́нович Батья́нов) (1835 – 5 December 1916) was a general in the Imperial Russian Army.

== Biography ==
Batyanov was a graduate of the Sea Cadet Corps in 1852, and served with the Black Sea Fleet of the Imperial Russian Navy in the Caucasus campaigns of 1852–1854. As part of a naval infantry battalion, he distinguished himself at the Battle of Sevastopol during the Crimean War, where he was wounded. He was decorated with the Order of St Anne, 3rd class with swords (1854), and the Order of St Vladimir, 4th class with swords (1855) during the war.

Afterwards, Batyanov transferred to the Imperial Russian Army, serving with the Imperial Guards followed by the Zhytomyr 56th Infantry Regiment in 1861. He was awarded the Gold Sword for Bravery in the campaigns against the Caucasus War in 1864 and was promoted to colonel in 1867 and commander of the Kabardian 80th Infantry Regiment. Promoted to adjutant in 1871, he participated in suppression of an uprising in the Terek region. Batyanov was awarded the Order of St George, 4th class in 1873 for his actions as a midshipman in the Crimean War.

In 1877, Batyanov was promoted to major general, and the following year received command of the 2nd Brigade, 1st Grenadier Division. The following year, he received the Order of St Anne, 1st class and the Order of St Stanislaus, 1st class with swords. He was commander of the Third Infantry Brigade from 1881 to 1886. Promoted to lieutenant general, he then commanded the 13th and 23rd Infantry Divisions. In 1883, he was awarded the Order of St Vladimir, 2nd class.

From 1893 to 1896, Batyanov was commander of the 12th Army Corps in the Kiev Military District. He introduced many innovations, including rapid-fire weapons (machine guns) and new tactics, placing strong emphasis on modernization of training. For this, he earned the strong disapproval of his superior, General Mikhail Dragomirov, who forced Batyanov into the reserves. However, Batyanov was reinstated only a year later, this time as commander of the 16th Army Corps, which he again attempted to modernize. In 1903, he was promoted to General of Infantry and appointed to the Military Council. During the Russo-Japanese War, he was appointed commander of the Third Manchuria Army in May 1905, replacing General Alexandr von Bilderling after the Battle of Mukden. He helped organize a new defensive line north of Mukden against a possible further Japanese offensive.

Batyanov retired in January 1911 and died in Petrograd on 5 December 1916. His grave was at the Alexander Nevsky Lavra.

== Awards ==
- 1854 Order of St. Anne 3rd degree
- 1855 Order of St Vladimir 4th degree
- 1864 Gold Sword for Bravery
- 1873 Order of St George, 4th degree
- 1879 Order of St. Stanislaus 1st degree
- 1880 Order of St. Anne 1st degree
- 1883 Order of St Vladimir 2nd degree

Preceded by Alexander Konstantinovich Abramov	Commander of the 13th Infantry Division (Russian Empire); 1886-1888	Succeeded by
Preceded by	Commander of the 23rd Infantry Division (Russian Empire); 1888-1893	Succeeded by
