= 22nd Infantry Division (Russian Empire) =

- 22-я пехотная дивизия
- Active: 1807–1918
- Country: Russian Empire; Russian Republic (from 1917)
- Branch: Imperial Russian Army; Russian Army (from 1917)
- Role: Infantry
- Part of: 1st Army Corps

The 22nd Infantry Division (Russian: 22-я пехо́тная диви́зия, 22-ya Pekhotnaya Diviziya) was an infantry formation of the Russian Imperial Army. It was part of the 1st Army Corps.

== Organization ==
- 1st Brigade
  - 85th "Vyborksky" Infantry Regiment
  - 86th "Vilmanstranski" Infantry Regiment
- 2nd Brigade
  - 87th "Neishlotski" Infantry Regiment
  - 88th "Petrovski" Infantry Regiment
- 22nd Artillery Brigade

== Commanders ==
- 1906–1908: Leonid Artamonov
- 1909–1912: Vladimir Olokhov
- 30 May – 30 July 1912: Andrei Zayonchkovski
- 1912–1914: Alexander Alexandrovich Dushkevich
- 29 October 1916 – 22 August 1917: Adrian Usov

== Chiefs of Staff ==
- 1866–1868: Aleksandr Fyodorovich Rittikh
- 1868–1876: Nikolay Bobrikov
- 1876–1879: Leonid Dembowsky
- 1879–1884: Ivan Iosifovich Yakubovsky
- 1884–1890: Alexander Birger
- 1903–1905: Victor Karl Hermann Kohlschmidt
- 1905–1911: Alexey Cherepennikov
- March–November 1914: Adolph Pfingsten
