= 24th Infantry Division (Russian Empire) =

- 24-я пехотная дивизия
- Active: 1914–1918
- Country: Russian Empire
- Branch: Russian Imperial Army
- Role: Infantry

The 24th Infantry Division (Russian: 24-я пехо́тная диви́зия, 24-ya Pekhotnaya Diviziya) was an infantry formation of the Russian Imperial Army. It was part of the 1st Army Corps.

== Organization ==
- 1st Brigade
  - 93rd "Irkutski" Infantry Regiment
  - 94th "Eniceiski" Infantry Regiment
- 2nd Brigade
  - 95th "Krasnoyarski" Infantry Regiment
  - 96th "Omski" Infantry Regiment
- 24th Artillery Brigade

== Commanders ==
- 1868–1876: Alexander Petrovich Barklai de-Tolli-Veimarn
- 1897-1902: Leonid Matveyevich Dembowsky
- 1902-1904: Anton Yegorovich von Saltza
