= 43rd Infantry Division (Russian Empire) =

- 43-я пехотная дивизия
- Active: 1914–1918
- Country: Russian Empire
- Branch: Russian Imperial Army
- Role: Infantry

The 43rd Infantry Division (Russian: 43-я пехотная дивизия, 43-ya Pekhotnaya Diviziya) was an infantry formation of the Russian Imperial Army.

== Organization ==
- 1st Brigade
  - 169th Infantry Regiment
  - 170th Infantry Regiment
- 2nd Brigade
  - 171st Infantry Regiment
  - 172nd Infantry Regiment
- 43rd Artillery Brigade

== Commanders ==
- 1903-1910: V.A. Orlov
- 1910-1915: Vladimir A. Sliusarenko
- 1917: Alexey Cherepennikov
