= Alexey Cherepennikov =

Russian major general and Great Purge victim (1869–1937)

Alexey Ivanovich Cherepennikov
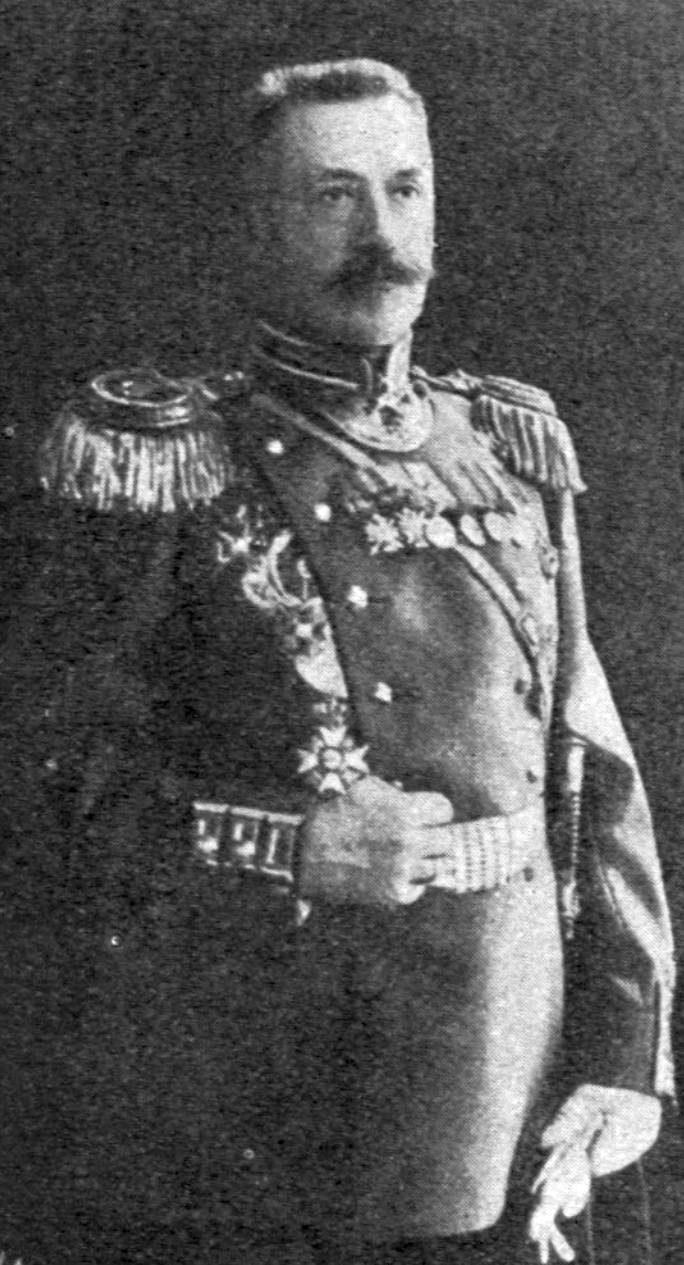
- Born: June 28, 1869
- Died: 1937 (aged 67–68)
- Military career
- Allegiance: Russian Empire; Soviet Union
- Branch: Imperial Russian Army; Soviet Red Army
- Service years: 1887-1917 (Russian Empire); 1918-1937(Soviet Union)
- Rank: major general
- Unit: 22nd Infantry Division (Russian Empire)
- Commands: 43rd Infantry Division (Russian Empire)
- Conflicts: Russo-Japanese War; World War I

Alexey Ivanovich Cherepennikov (June 28, 1869 – 1937) - Russian major general, participant in the First World War. He served in the Red Army, repressed in 1937.

== Biography ==
Cherepennikov graduated from the 2nd Petersburg real school. He enlisted on September 1, 1887. He graduated from Nikolayev Engineering College in 1890. Released as a Podporuchik in the 7th combat engineer battalion. Transferred to the 2nd reserve combat engineer battalion. He was promoted to poruchik on August 9, 1892. He graduated from the Nikolayev Academy of the General Staff in the 1st category in 1896. May 17, 1896 - Headquarters Captain, appointed to be a member of the Warsaw Military District. December 20, 1897 - Senior Adjutant to the Headquarters of the 2nd Infantry Division (Russian Empire). He was promoted to captain on April 5, 1898. November 10, 1898 - November 14, 1899 - Qualified command of a company in the 198th infantry reserve Alexander Nevsky regiment. January 13, 1900 - Assistant Senior Adjutant to the Headquarters of the Warsaw Military District. April 14, 1902 - Lieutenant Colonel, head officer for special assignments at the headquarters of the XVII Army Corps. 1904-1905 - Participated in the Russo-Japanese War. He was made chief of staff of the 22nd Infantry Division (Russian Empire) on March 11, 1905. He was promoted to colonel on April 2, 1906. May 5-September 25, 1907 - The censored command of the battalion was serving in the 85th Vyborg Infantry Regiment. May 7-July 8, 1908 - Sent to artillery. September 4–28, 1909 - He was assigned to the cavalry. November 2, 1911 - commander of the 8th Grenadier Moscow Regiment. 1914 - General for errands under the command of the 5th Army (Russian Empire). He was promoted to major general on October 13, 1914. Duty general of the Headquarters of the 5th Army (Russian Empire). October 5, 1915 - Duty General of the Headquarters of the 6th Army (Russian Empire). The duty general of the headquarters of the 12th army. April 20, 1916 - chief of staff of the 23rd Army Corps (Russian Empire). He was made commander of the 43rd Infantry Division (Russian Empire) on April 7, 1917.

=== Service with the Red Army ===
Cherepennikov voluntarily joined the Red Army. Consisted for errands under the chief of staff of the Petrograd Military District. I. D. Head of the Mobilization Directorate of the Headquarters of the Petrograd Military District. Teacher of 2 Finnish communist courses in Petrograd. Assistant head of the 9th Infantry School. June 1921 - Full-time teacher of the 1st Petrograd Infantry School. August 13, 1921 - Assistant head of the 1st Infantry School. He retired in 1937 and lived in Orenburg. On October 25, 1937, Cherepennikov was convicted by a troika at the UNKVD in the Orenburg region and sentenced to capital punishment. He was rehabilitated in July 1989.

== Awards ==
- Order of St. Stanislav III degree (1903)
- Order of St. Anna, III degree with swords and bow (1905)
- Order of St. Stanislav II degree with swords (1906)
- Order of St. Anna, II degree with swords (1906)
- Order of St. Vladimir IV degree with swords and bow (1907)
- Order of St. Vladimir 3rd art. (December 6, 1909)
- Order of St. Vladimir with swords 3rd Art. (VP 10/27/1914)
- St. Stanislaus 1st Art. (VP 05/31/1915)
- Order of St. Anna 1st Art. (VP 01/07/1916)
- Order of St. Vladimir 2nd Art. with swords (PAF 03/20/1917).

Military offices
Preceded by Victor Karl Hermann Kohlschmidt	Chief of Staff of the 22nd Infantry Division (Russian Empire); 1905-1911	Succeeded by
Preceded by	Commander of the 43rd Infantry Division; 1917	Succeeded by

== Sources ==
- Zalessky K.A. Who was who in the First World War. M., 2003.
- List of persons with higher general military education who are in the service of the Red Army as of 03/01/1923. M., 1923.
- Kavtaradze A.G. Military experts in the service of the Republic of Soviets. M., 1988.
- List of senior military commanders, chiefs of staff: districts, corps and divisions and commanders of individual combat units. St. Petersburg. Military Printing House. 1913.
- List of the General Staff. Fixed on 06/01/1914. Petrograd, 1914
- List of the General Staff. Fixed on 01/01/1916. Petrograd, 1916
- List of the General Staff. Fixed on 01/03/1917. Petrograd, 1917
- List of the General Staff. Corrected on 03/01/1918.//Ganin A.V. Corps of officers of the General Staff during the Civil War 1917-1922 M., 2010.
- List of generals by seniority. Compiled on July 10, 1916. Petrograd, 1916
- Photo from Ogonyok magazine, 1914. Courtesy of Ilya Mukhin (Moscow)
- Victims of political terror in the USSR. 3rd edition on CDs, Zvenya Publishing House, Moscow, 2004. Information provided by Konstantin Podlessky
- http://lists.memo.ru/d35/f403.htm Information provided by Ilya Mukhin (Moscow)
- VP 1914-1917 and PAF 1917. Information was provided by Valery Konstantinovich Vokhmyanin (Kharkov)
- Army and Navy of Free Russia (former Russian Invalid). No. 136, 1917 // Information provided by Pavel Reznichenko
- VP for the military department // Scout # 1265, 02/03/1915
- VP for the military department // Scout No. 1293, 08/18/1915
- ELECTRONIC MEMORY BOOK "RETURNED NAMES" Information provided by Konstantin Podlesky
- RGVIA. Loss Records Bureau file. Officer's file card
- "Alexey Cherepennikov" (in Russian). «Russian army in a Great war» project.
