= 1st Finnish Rifle Regiment =

- 1-й Финляндский стрелковый полк
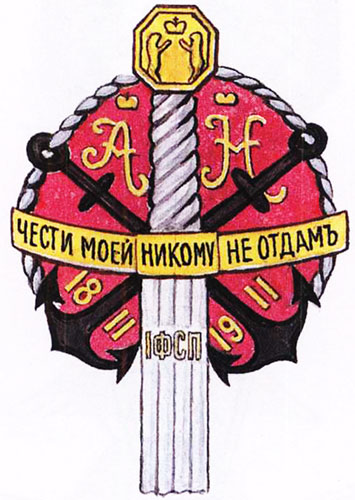
- 1st Finnish Rifle Regiment
- Active: 1811 - 1918
- Country: Russian Empire
- Branch: Imperial Russian Army; Russian Army (1917)
- Type: Infantry
- Garrison/HQ: Turku
- Engagements: World War I

1st Finnish Rifle Regiment (Russian : 1-й Финляндский стрелковый полк) is a rifle unit of the army of the Russian Empire.

== History ==
The regiment was established in March 27 1811, and was stationed in the town of Turku.

In July of 1914 the regiment was under the 1st Finnish Rifle Brigade which was under the 22nd Army Corps.

== Commanders ==
- 09.15.1892 - 09.16.1896 - Colonel Alekseev Konstantin Mikhailovich
- 06/07/1898 - 09/15/1904 - Colonel Alekseev Ivan Filippovich
- 09/25/1904 - 12/19/1906 - Colonel Tikhonovich Pyotr Andreevich
- 19/12/1906 - 18/11/1908 - Colonel Goshtovt Iosif Andreevich
- 18/11/1908 - 15/04/1913 - Colonel Stepanov Yuri Nikolaevich
- 15/04/1913 - 24/12/1914 - Colonel Richter Alexander Alexandrovich
- 02/26/1915 - 01/21/1916 - Colonel Alekseev Vladimir Vasilievich
- 01/27/1916 - 04/12/1917 - Colonel Pyotr Sergeevich Shorin
