= Alexander Alexandrovich von Bilderling =

Russian general (1846–1912)

Baron Alexander Alexandrovich von Bilderling
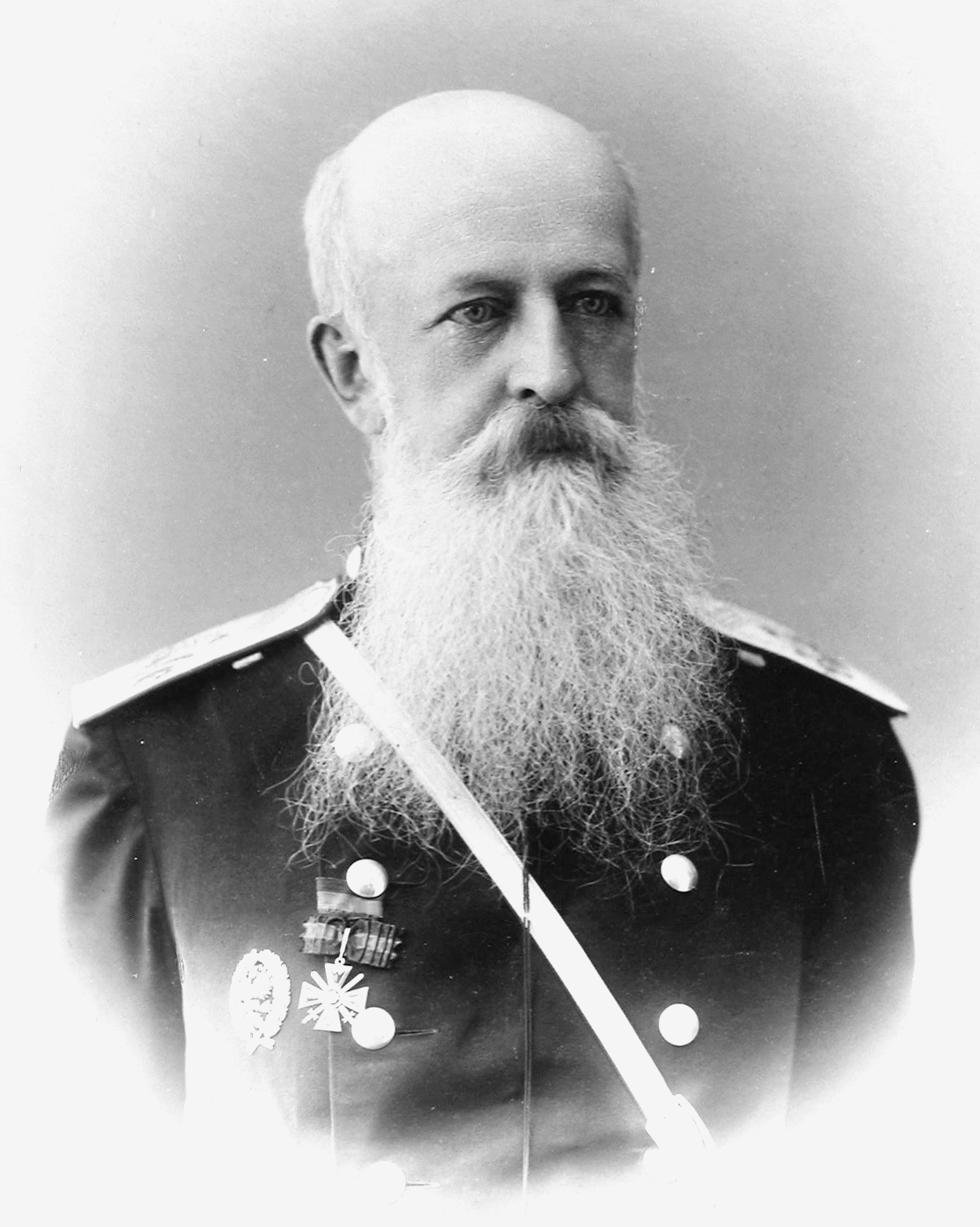
- General Alexander Alexandrovich von Bilderling
- Born: 5 July [O.S. 23 June] 1846; Saint Petersburg, Russia
- Died: 26 July [O.S. 13 July] 1912 (aged 66); Tsarskoye Selo, Russia
- Burial place: Novodevichy Cemetery, Saint Petersburg
- Military career
- Allegiance: Russia
- Branch: Imperial Russian Army
- Service years: 1866–1905
- Rank: General of the Cavalry
- Commands: 17th European Army Corps; Third Manchurian Army
- Conflicts: Russo-Turkish War (1877–1878); Russo-Japanese War
- Awards: see below

Baron Alexander Alexandrovich Bilderling (Russian: Алекса́ндр Алекса́ндрович фон Би́льдерлинг, romanized: Aleksandr Aleksandrovich Bilderling; 5 July [O.S. 23 June] 1846 – 26 July [O.S. 13 July] 1912), better known as Baron Alexander Alexandrovich von Bilderling, was a Russian general of Baltic German descent, noted for his role in the Russo-Japanese War. He was also an artist and monument designer.

== Biography ==
=== Family ===
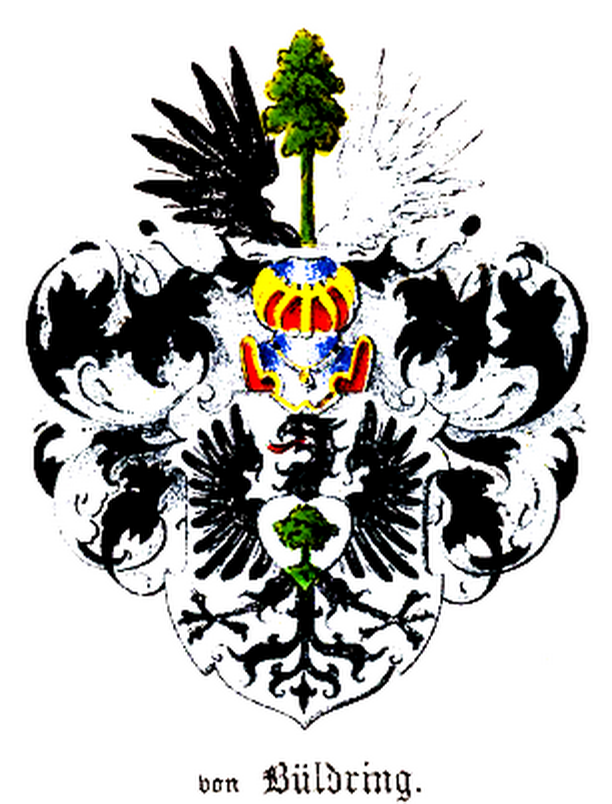
Coat of arms of the Büldring-Bilderling family

Alexander Alexandrovich Bilderling was born on July 5, 1844, in Saint Petersburg into the Baltic German noble family of Büldring-Bilterling (also known as Bilderling), originating from Westphalia. His father was Alexander Otto Hermann Freiherr von Bilderling, who was an officer in the Imperial Guards Bilderling's grandfather, Georg Friedrich Sigismund Freiherr von Bilterling, was a Lutheran pastor in Mitau (now Jelgava).

=== Career ===
He graduated with honors from the Page Corps and was commissioned as a cavalry lieutenant in 1864 and promoted to captain in 1866. He graduated from the General Staff Academy in 1870 and served in the Kiev Military District from 1870 to 1875. Promoted to colonel in 1872, he became commandant of the Tver Cavalry Academy in 1875 and was assigned command of the 12th Dragoon Regiment in 1877 and became commandant of the prestigious Nicholas Cavalry College in 1878.

From 1877 to 1878, Bilderling participated in the Russo-Turkish War. He joined the General Staff in 1891 and was promoted to the rank of lieutenant-general in 1892. In 1899, he became commander of the 17th Army Corps and was promoted to general of cavalry in 1901.

During the Russo-Japanese War of 1904–1905, Bilderling commanded the 17th European Army Corps from May 1904, accompanying it to Manchuria in the summer of the same year. He was in command of the eastern flank at the Battle of Liaoyang and of the western flank at the Battle of Shaho. After the Battle of Sandepu, Bilderling replaced Alexander Kaulbars as commander of the Third Manchurian Army. However, after the Battle of Mukden, he was relieved of his command from May–September 1905 and was replaced as commander of the Third Manchurian Army by General Mikhail Batyanov. He was later bitterly blamed by General Aleksey Kuropatkin for the defeat. He served as a member of the Board of War from 1905 to 1912.

In addition to his military career, Bilderling was also a noted painter and designer of monuments. In his declining years, he participated in commissions for installing monuments and organizing commemorative activities.

He was buried at the Novodevichy Cemetery in Saint Petersburg, but his grave is not preserved.

== Awards ==
- Order of St Vladimir 4th degree
- Order of St Vladimir 3rd degree
- Order of St Vladimir 2nd degree
- Order of St. Anne 3rd degree
- Order of St. Anne 2nd degree
- Order of St. Anne 1st degree
- Order of St. Stanislaus 3rd degree
- Order of St. Stanislaus 2nd degree with swords
- Order of St. Stanislaus 1st degree
- Order of St. Alexander Nevsky (1904)
- Order of the Sword, 1st class (Sweden)
- Order of the Crown, 2nd class (Prussia)
- Order of the Red Eagle, 1st class (Prussia)
- Legion of Honor, Commanders Cross, (France)
- Gold Sword for Bravery

== Sources ==
- "Бильдерлинг, Александр Александрович" . Brockhaus and Efron Encyclopedic Dictionary (in Russian). 1906.
- Connaughton, R. M. (1988). The War of the Rising Sun and the Tumbling Bear—A Military History of the Russo-Japanese War 1904–5. London: Routledge. ISBN 0-415-00906-5.
- Jukes, Geoffry. The Russo-Japanese War 1904–1905. Osprey Essential Histories. (2002). ISBN 978-1-84176-446-7.
- Kowner, Rotem (2006). Historical Dictionary of the Russo-Japanese War. The Scarecrow Press. ISBN 0-8108-4927-5.
