= Alexander Barclay de Tolly-Weymarn =

Baltic German general (1824–1905)

Prince Alexander Barclay de Tolly-Weymarn
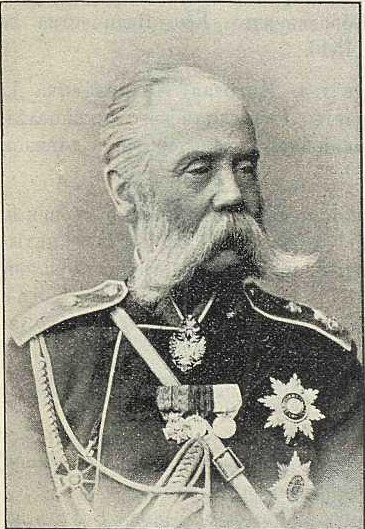
- Born: Alexander Magnus Friedrich von Weymarn; December 22, 1824; Pärnu, Governorate of Livonia, Russian Empire
- Died: May 8, 1905 (aged 80) Dresden, Kingdom of Saxony, German Empire
- Allegiance: Russia
- Branch: Imperial Russian Army
- Commands: Pavlovsky Regiment; 24th Infantry Division; 1st Army Corps
- Conflicts: Russo-Turkish War

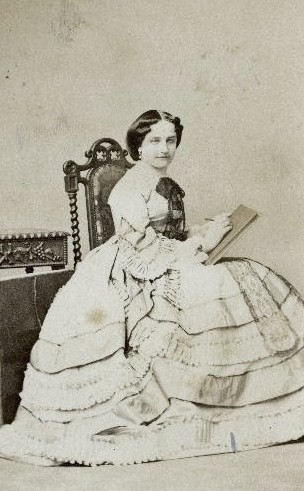
Marie Friederike von Seddeler

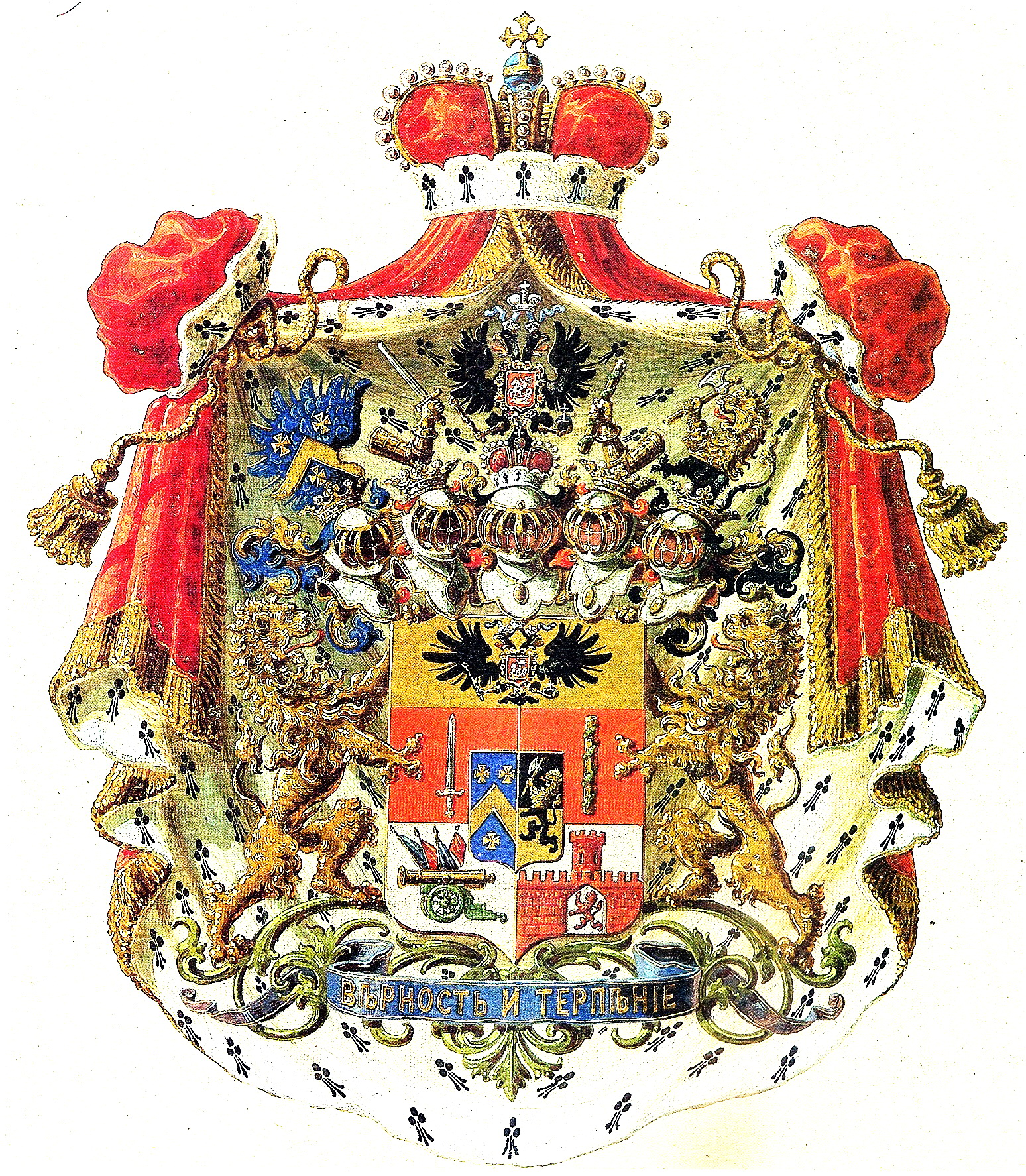
The coat of arms of Prince Barclay de Tolly-Weymarn

Prince Alexander Magnus Friedrich Barclay de Tolly-Weymarn (Russian: Алекса́ндр Петро́вич Баркла́й де То́лли-Ве́ймарн, Alexander Petrovich Barklay-de-Tolli-Veymarn; December 22, 1824 – May 8, 1905), born as Alexander Magnus Friedrich von Weymarn, was a Baltic German military commander who served in the Imperial Russian Army.

== Life and family ==
He was a member of the Baltic German nobility, and the son of General Wilhelm Peter Jost von Weymarn (1793–1846) and his wife, Christina Augusta von Lueder (1803–1887). He married Marie Friederike von Seddeler in 1849 and had three children: daughters Alexandrine "Ada" Auguste Olga Barclay de Tolly-Weymarn and Marie "Mira" Georgia Augusta Barclay de Tolly-Weymarn, and son Ludwig Alexander Michael Barclay de Tolly-Weymarn.

His maternal grandmother was the sister of Prince Michael Andreas Barclay de Tolly, a very prominent military commander who was made a count in 1813 and a prince in 1815 by Alexander I of Russia. After the extinction of the original Barclay de Tolly princely line upon the death in 1871 of Prince Michael's son (Magnus Barclay de Tolly), Alexander von Weymarn was allowed to assume the title of Prince Barclay de Tolly-Weymarn in 1872, by permission of Alexander II of Russia.

== Honours ==
=== Russian orders and decorations ===
- Knight of the Imperial Order of Saint Anna, 3rd Class, 1849; 2nd Class, 1855; 1st Class, 1864
- Knight of the Imperial Order of Saint Vladimir, 4th Class, 1856; 3rd Class, 1860; 2nd Class, 1869
- Knight of the Imperial Order of Saint Stanislaus, 1st Class, 1861
- Knight of the Imperial Order of the White Eagle
- Knight of the Imperial Order of Saint Alexander Nevsky, 1886

=== Foreign orders and decorations ===
- House and Merit Order of Peter Frederick Louis, 3rd Class
- Grand Cross of the Order of the Dannebrog, 13 December 1867
- Knight of the Order of the Red Eagle, 1st Class, 7 May 1873
- Knight of the Order of the Iron Crown, 1st Class, 1874
- Commander Grand Cross of the Royal Order of the Sword, 19 July 1875
- Grand Cross of the House Order of the Wendish Crown, with Golden Crown, 16 February 1876

== Bibliography ==
- Baltische Historische Kommission (Hrsg.): Weymarn, Alexander Magnus Friedrich v., seit 31. Mai 1872 Fürst Barclay de Tolly-W. In: BBLd – Baltisches Biographisches Lexikon digital. Göttingen 2012.
- Nicolai von Essen (Hrsg.): Genealogisches Handbuch der Oeselschen Ritterschaft. Tartu, 1935, S. 443.
- Genealogisches Handbuch der Baltischen Ritterschaften. (Neue Folge), Band 2, Hamburg 2012, S. 28–31.
- Genealogisches Handbuch der baltischen Ritterschaften. Teil 2, 3: Estland. Görlitz 1930, S. 274f.

Preceded by Veljaminov	Commander of the Pavlovsky Regiment; 1863–1867	Succeeded by
Preceded by	Commander of the 24th Infantry Division; 1868–1876	Succeeded by
Preceded by New office	Commander of the 1st Army Corps; 1876–1888	Succeeded by Mikhail Pavlovich Danilov
