= 47th Infantry Division (Russian Empire) =

- 47-я пехотная дивизия
- Active: 1914–1918
- Country: Russian Empire
- Branch: Russian Imperial Army
- Role: Infantry

The 47th Infantry Division (Russian: 47-я пехотная дивизия, 47-ya Pekhotnaya Diviziya) was an infantry formation of the Russian Imperial Army.

== Organization ==
It was part of the 16th Army Corps.

- 1st Brigade
  - 185th Infantry Regiment
  - 186th Infantry Regiment
- 2nd Brigade
  - 187th Infantry Regiment
  - 188th Infantry Regiment
- 47th Artillery Brigade
