= Adolph Pfingsten =

Imperial Russian Army officer (1867–1914)

Adolph Ferdinandovich Pfingsten
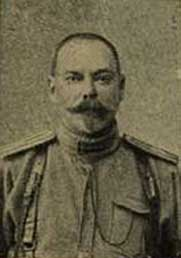
- Born: 25 December 1867
- Died: 9 November 1914 (aged 46) near Łódź, Russian Empire
- Military career
- Allegiance: Russian Empire
- Branch: Imperial Russian Army
- Rank: Colonel
- Unit: 22nd Infantry Division (Russian Empire)
- Conflicts: Russo-Japanese War; World War I

Adolph Ferdinandovich Pfingsten (25 December 1867 – 9 November 1914) was an Imperial Russian Army officer.

== Biography ==
Pfingsten was born on 25 December 1867. He received his primary education in the 2nd St. Petersburg Cadet Corps, after which on 1 September 1886 he was admitted to the 1st Military Pavlovsk School.

He was released on 9 August 1888 as a second lieutenant in the 4th Artillery Brigade. Then he served in the 24th artillery brigade and the 1st East Siberian rifle artillery brigade and subsequently received the rank of lieutenant (7 August 1891), staff captain (28 July 1896) and captain (28 July 1900).

In 1900, Pfingsten successfully passed the entrance exams to the Nikolaev Academy of the General Staff, which he graduated in 1902 in the 1st category. After graduating from the academy, he was at a camp in the Vilna Military District (Russian Empire), and from 27 October 1902 to 16 February 1904, he commanded a company in the 8th Grenadier Moscow Regiment to undergo qualification.

With the outbreak of the Russo-Japanese War, Pfingsten went to the Far East, where on 3 April 1904 he was appointed chief officer for special assignments at the headquarters of the 2nd Siberian Army Corps, and from 25 April he was chief officer for assignments under the control of the Quartermaster Manchurian army, in addition to this post, he was an officer-in-charge from 24 November for office management and assignments for the management of the quarter-general of the headquarters of the Commander-in-Chief in the Far East. He took part in hostilities against Japan and on 6 December 1904 was promoted to lieutenant colonel for military distinctions.

At the end of the Russo-Japanese War, Pfingsten was appointed headquarters officer for special assignments at the headquarters of the 8th Army Corps on 11 April 1906, and the battalion qualified command left from 20 May to 17 September 1908 in the 60th Zamotsky Infantry Regiment, and 20 June formally was appointed chief of staff of the Kuban Plastun Brigade. 6 December of the same year promoted to colonel.

31 March 1914 Pfingsten was appointed chief of staff of the 22nd Infantry Division. Since the beginning of World War I, he fought in East Prussia and Poland. In autumn, he was appointed commander of the 96th Omsk Infantry Regiment, but did not manage to take office, since on 9 November he was killed in battle near the village of Feliksen near Lodz.

By the highest order of 11 March 1915, Colonel Pfingsten was posthumously awarded the George Weapons “For the fact that in the battles from September 30. 6 Oct. 1914 and in battles with the German rearguards from October 7 to 14. 1914, with outstanding success, fulfilling the post of chief of staff of the 22nd Infantry Division, repeatedly endangering his life, and by correctly assessing the situation, he assisted the chief of the division in achieving the goals set by the division. "

By the same order he was awarded the Order of St. George 4th degree “For the fact that during the Lodz battles, being the chief of staff, the 22nd infantry. div., carried out a number of combat missions to restore order in the battle areas attacked by the enemy, taking a number of measures on his own initiative and with his personal courage kept the troops in their occupied positions. In one of these battles, he was killed.

Military offices
Preceded by	Chief of Staff of the 22nd Infantry Division; March – November 1914	Succeeded by

== Awards ==
- Order of Saint Stanislaus (House of Romanov) 3rd degree (1894, swords and a bow to this order were granted in 1907)
- Order of Saint Stanislaus (House of Romanov) 2nd degree with swords (1904)
- Order of St. Anna, 2nd degree with swords (1905)
- Order of St. Vladimir, 4th degree with swords and bow (1906)
- Order of St. Vladimir, 3rd degree (6 May 1912)
- Saint George Sword (Golden Weapon for Bravery 11 March 1915); posthumous
- Order of St. George 4th degree (11 March 1915); posthumous

== Sources ==
- The highest orders of the War Department. To No. 1276 of the "Scout". pp. 313, 317
- Ganin A.V. Corps of officers of the General Staff during the Civil War of 1917–1922. Reference materials. – M., 2009. p. 801. ISBN 978-5-85887-301-3
- A list of senior colonels. Compiled on 1 March 1914. St. Petersburg, 1914. p. 402.
- Shabanov V.M. Military Order of the Holy Great Martyr and Victorious George. Nominal lists 1769–1920. Bibliographic reference. – M., 2004. p. 715. ISBN 5-89577-059-2
