= 41st Infantry Division (Russian Empire) =

- 41-я пехотная дивизия
- Active: 1914–1918
- Country: Russian Empire
- Branch: Russian Imperial Army
- Role: Infantry

The 41st Infantry Division (Russian: 41-я пехотная дивизия, 41-ya Pekhotnaya Diviziya) was an infantry formation of the Russian Imperial Army.

== Organization ==
It was part of the 16th Army Corps.

- 1st Brigade
  - 161st Infantry Regiment
  - 162nd Infantry Regiment
- 2nd Brigade
  - 163rd Infantry Regiment
  - 164th Infantry Regiment
- 41st Artillery Brigade
