= Alexander Alexandrovich Dushkevich =

Russian general (1853–1918)

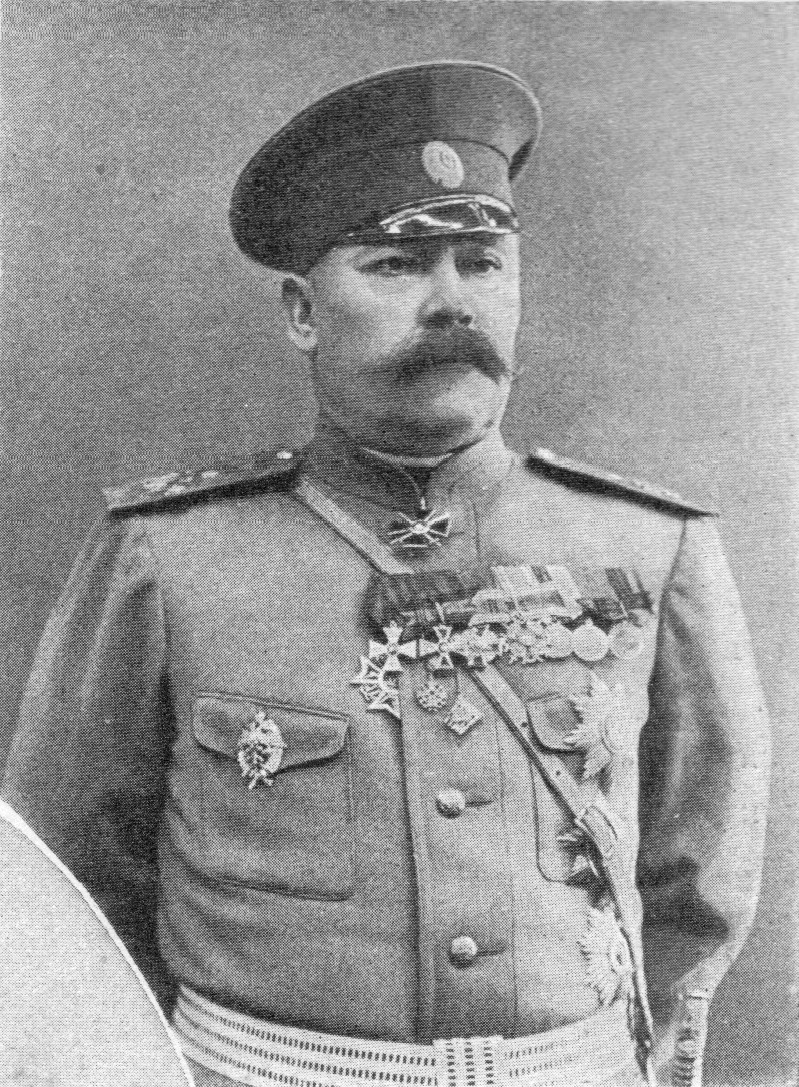
- Born: 20 September 1853
- Died: 1918 (aged 64–65)
- Allegiance: Russian Empire
- Branch: Imperial Russian Army
- Rank: General of the Infantry
- Commands: 22nd Infantry Division; 1st Army Corps
- Conflicts: Russo-Turkish War; Russo-Japanese War; World War I; Battle of Tannenberg

Alexander Alexandrovich Dushkevich (Russian: Александр Александрович Душкевич; 20 September 1853 – 1918) was an Imperial Russian division and corps commander. He took part in the war against the Ottoman Empire and the Empire of Japan. He was promoted to major general in 1905 and lieutenant general in 1910. He fought against the German Empire on the Eastern Front.

== Awards ==
- Order of Saint Stanislaus (House of Romanov), 3rd class, 1878
- Order of Saint Anna, 3rd class, 1888
- Order of Saint Vladimir, 3rd class, 1904
- Order of Saint George, 4th class, 1905
- Order of Saint Stanislaus (House of Romanov), 1st class, 1907
- Order of Saint Anna, 1st class, 1912
- Order of Saint Vladimir, 2nd class, 1914
- Order of the White Eagle (Russian Empire), 1915
- Order of Saint Alexander Nevsky, 1916

Preceded by Andrei Zayonchkovski	Commander of the 22nd Infantry Division; 1912–1914	Succeeded by
Preceded by Leonid-Otto Ottovich Sirilius	Commander of the 1st Army Corps; October 1914 – April 1916	Succeeded by Vasily Timofeyvich Gavrilov

== Sources ==
- "Alexander Alexandrovich Dushkevich" (in Russian). «Russian army in a Great war» project.
- ДУШКЕВИЧЪ Александръ Александровичъ
