= Barclay de Tolly =

Baltic German noble family

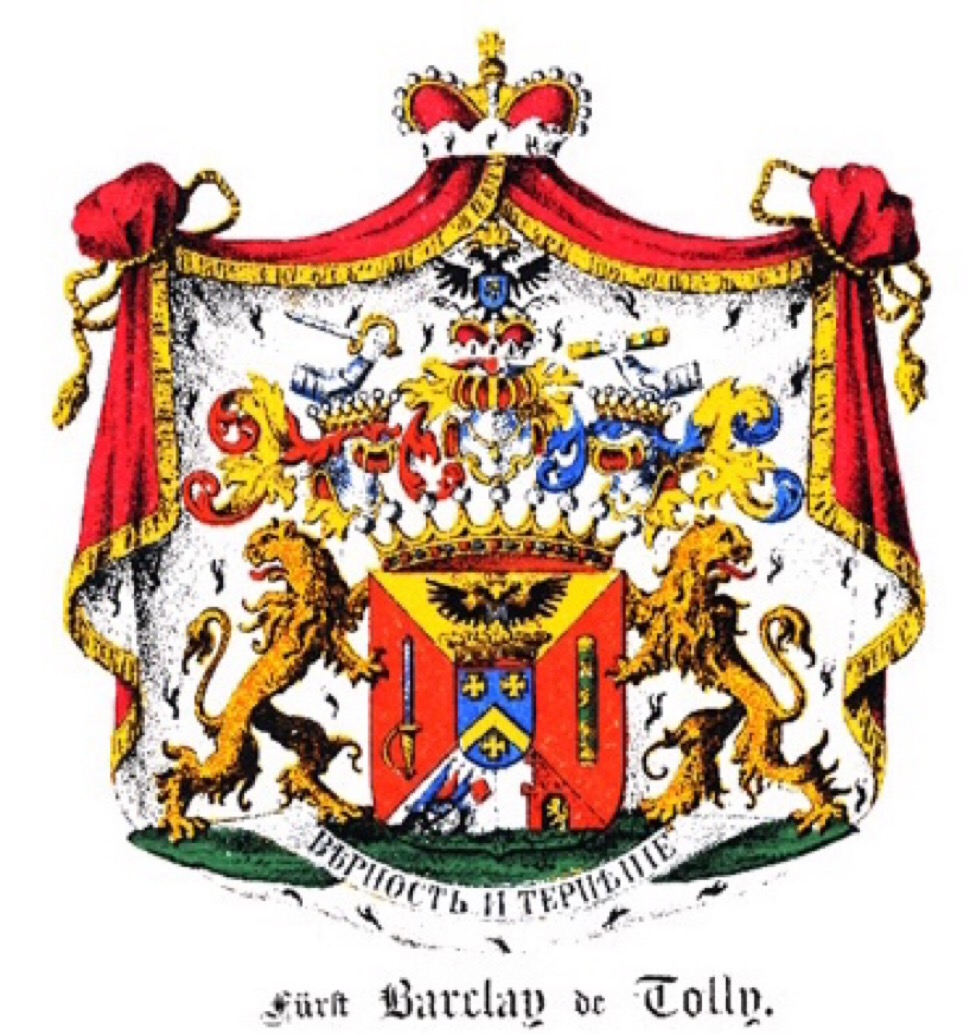
- Arms of Prince Barclay de Tolly
- Parent house: Clan Barclay
- Country: Russian Empire
- Titles: Prince
- Motto: Вѣрность и терпѣнiе ("Loyalty and patience")

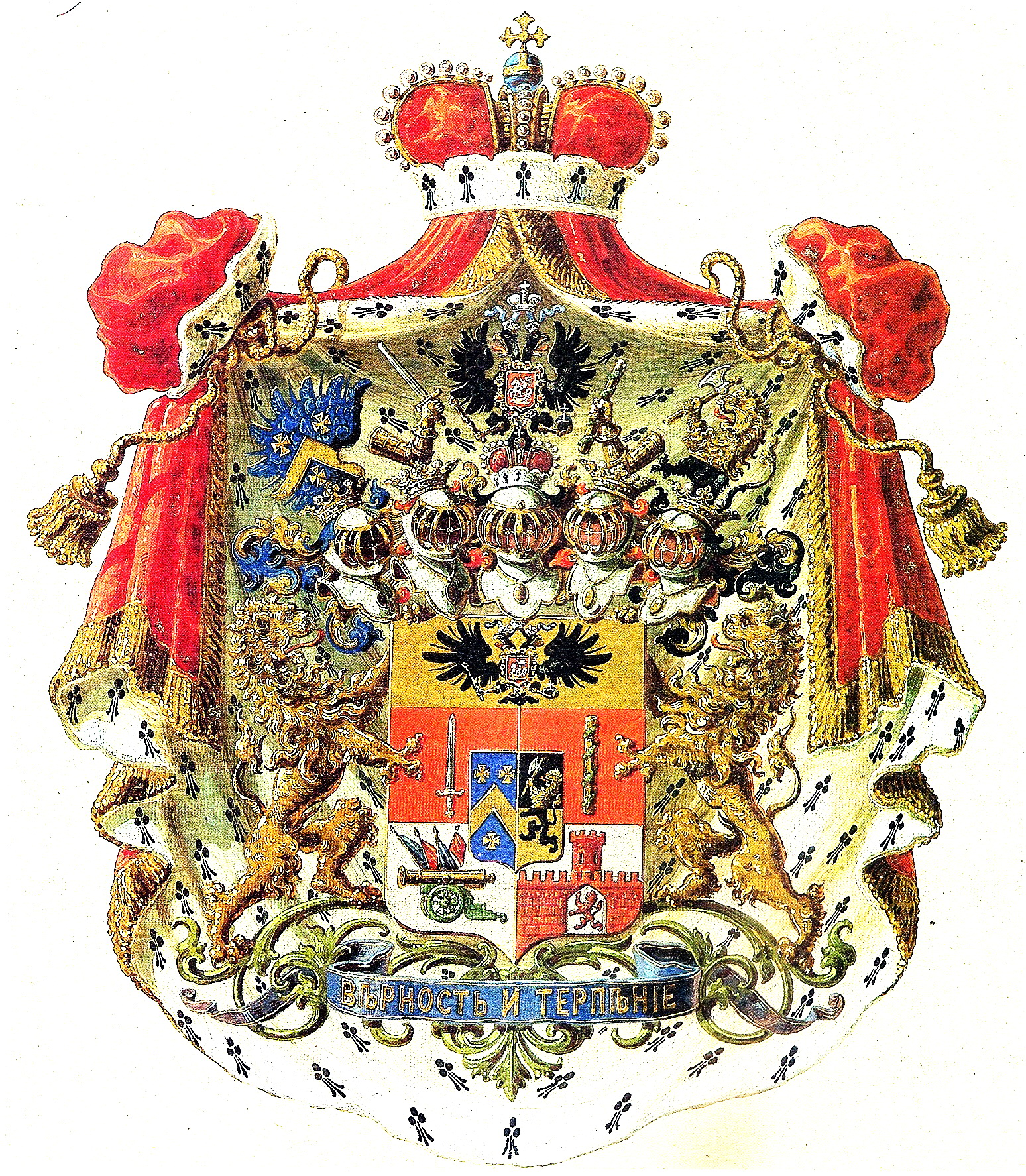
The coat of arms of Prince Barclay de Tolly-Weymarn

The Barclays de Tolly (Russian: Баркла́й-де-То́лли, romanized: Barklay-de-Tolli) are a Baltic German noble family. They descend from Peter Barclay, a merchant from Banff in Scotland who emigrated to Rostock in 1621. Barclay was himself descended from the barons of Towie or Tollie in Aberdeenshire. His son, Johann Stephan Barclay, settled in Riga and became the ancestor of the Livonian branch of the family.

Weinhold Gotthard Barclay (1734–1781), Johann Stephan's grandson, became a poruchik in the Russian Army and was the first of his family to be accepted into the Russian nobility. He was married to Margaretha Elisabeth von Smitten (1733–1771), and they had four sons: Emil Johann, a General in the Russian service; B. Michael Bogdanovitch; C. Andrei Bogdanovitch, a Colonel; and Michael Bogdanovitch (known as Prince Michael Andreas Barclay de Tolly), a very prominent military commander who was made a count in 1813 and a prince in 1815 by Alexander I of Russia.

After the extinction of the original princely line upon the death in 1871 of Prince Michael's son, Magnus, Alexander II of Russia allowed Prince Michael's sister's grandson (through female lineage), Alexander von Weymarn, to assume the title of Prince Barclay de Tolly-Weymarn in 1872.

== Notable family members ==
- Prince Michael Andreas Barclay de Tolly (Note: In Russian: Mikhail Bogdanovich Barklay-de-Tolli Cyrillic: Михаи́л Богда́нович Баркла́й-де-То́лли) (27 December [O.S. 16 December] 1761 – 26 May [O.S. 14 May] 1818) was an Imperial Russian Field Marshal and Minister of War during Napoleon's invasion in 1812 and War of the Sixth Coalition. He implemented a number of reforms during this time which improved the supply system in the army, doubled the number of army troops, and implemented new combat training principles. He was also the Governor-General of Finland.
- Prince Alexander Barclay de Tolly-Weymarn (December 22, 1824 – May 8, 1905) was an Imperial Russian regiment commander, division commander and corps commander. He was the son of Wilhelm Peter Jost von Weymarn and great-nephew of Prince Michael Andreas Barclay de Tolly. He married Marie Friederike von Seddeler in 1849 and had three children: daughters Alexandrine (Ada) Auguste Olga Barclay de Tolly-Weymarn and Marie (Mira) Georgia Augusta Barclay de Tolly-Weymarn, and son Ludwig (Louis) Alexander Michael Barclay de Tolly-Weymarn.

== Sources ==
- "Барклай де-Толли" . Brockhaus and Efron Encyclopedic Dictionary (in Russian). 1906.
- Josselson, M., & Josselson, D. (1980). The commander : a life of Barclay de Tolly. Oxford University Press.
