= Vasily Gavrilov =

Division and corps commander in the military of the Russian Empire

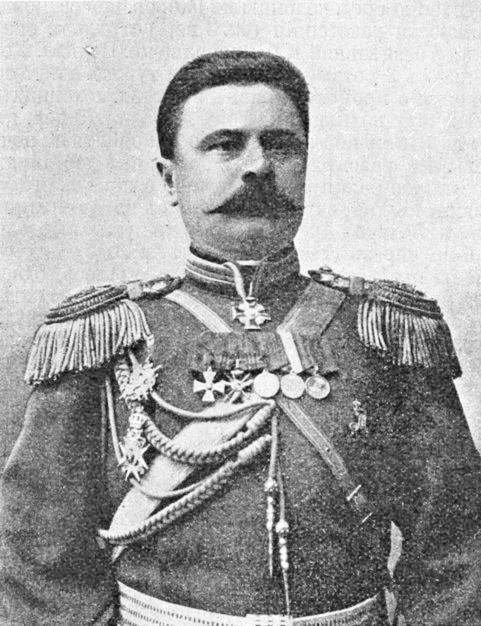
- Birth name: Vasily Timofeyvich Gavrilov
- Born: 6 March 1867
- Died: Unknown
- Allegiance: Russian Empire
- Branch: Imperial Russian Army
- Rank: lieutenant general
- Commands: 10th Infantry Division; 1st Army Corps
- Conflicts: Boxer Rebellion; Russo-Japanese War; World War I

Vasily Timofeyvich Gavrilov (born 6 March 1867) was division and corps commander in the military of the Russian Empire. He fought in the war against the Japanese Empire. He was promoted to Polkovnik in 1905 and major general in 1911.

== Awards ==
- Order of Saint Stanislaus (House of Romanov), 2nd class, 1902
- Order of Saint Anna, 2nd class, 1904
- Order of Saint George, 4th degree, 1905
- Order of Saint Vladimir, 4th class, 1905
- Order of Saint Vladimir, 3rd class, 1909
- Gold Sword for Bravery, 1904

Preceded by	Commander of the 10th Infantry Division; 1915–1916	Succeeded by
Preceded by Alexander Alexandrovich Dushkevich	Commander of the 1st Army Corps; April–December 1916	Succeeded by Nikolai Ilyich Bulatov

== Sources ==
- Русская императорская армия: Биографии
- Гаврилов, Василий Тимофеевич.
