= Battle of Svistov =

1877 battle of the Russo-Turkish War (1877–1878)

Battle of Svishtov
- Part of Russo-Turkish War (1877–1878)
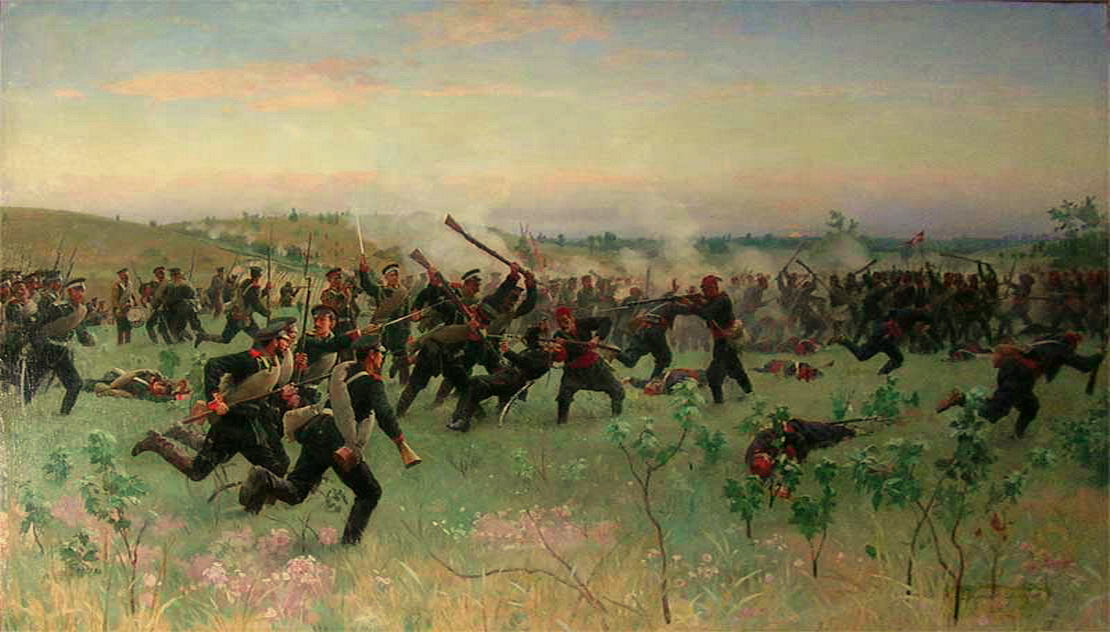
- The Battle of Svishtov by Nikolai Dmitriev-Orenburgsky
Date	26 June 1877
Location	Ziştovi District, Rusçuk Sanjak, Tuna Province, Ottoman Empire (today near Svishtov, Bulgaria) 43°36′53″N 25°23′59″E
Result	Russian victory

Belligerents
Russian Empire	Ottoman Empire

Commanders and leaders
Mikhail Dragomirov; Mikhail Skobelev; Ivan Bryanov (WIA)	Ahmed Pasha

Strength
15,000 troops 17 battalions 6,000 volunteers 64 field guns	13,000 garrison troops 6 camps 1 squadron 6 cannons

Casualties and losses
Less than 1,000	641 total

The Battle of Svishtov took place during the Russo-Turkish War of 1877–1878. It was fought between the Ottoman Empire and Imperial Russia on 26 June 1877. It occurred when Russian general Mikhail Ivanovich Dragomirov crossed the Danube River in a fleet of small boats and attacked the Turkish fortress. The next day, Mikhail Skobelev attacked, forcing the Turkish garrison to surrender. In result, the Russian military became ready to attack Nikopol.
