= 22nd Army Corps (Russian Empire) =

- 22-й армейский корпус
- Active: 1905–1918
- Country: Russian Empire
- Branch: (Russian Empire) Imperial Russian Army
- Type: Operational Formation
- Size: Army Corps
- Corps HQ: Helsingfors
- Engagements: World War I: Eastern Front

The 22nd Army Corps, (Russian: 22-й армейский корпус, romanized: 22-y armeyskiy korpus) was a tactical formation of the Imperial Russian Army based in the Grand Duchy of Finland before the beginning of the First World War. After seeing much service during the war, the corps was disbanded following the October Revolution.

== Russian Empire ==
In 1905, as part of the ongoing re-organisation of the Imperial Russian Army's higher-up fighting review, the 22nd Army Corps was formed with its headquarters in Helsingfors, today the Finnish capital of Helsinki. This new corps was known as the "Finnish/Finland Corps", as its troops were exclusively from the Grand Duchy of Finland, a sub-division of the Russian Empire. On formation, the new corps was assigned to the Saint Petersburg Military District, itself headquartered just over the border in the capital; Saint Petersburg.

When the First World War began, the corps was placed under the command of the 9th Army and transferred from army to army while seeing action of the Eastern Front. In November 1917, just after the October Revolution, the corps joined the new Western Front.

In 1917, the corps transferred control to the new Russian Republic, and later that year after the October Revolution, was disbanded.

=== Composition ===
==== 1914 ====
The below organisation is that of the corps on formation:

- 22nd Army Corps, HQ in Helsingfors
  - 20th Finnish Dragoon Regiment
  - Orenburg Cossack Division
  - 22nd Mortar Artillery Division
  - 22nd Sapper Battalion
  - 1st Finnish Rifle Brigade, HQ in Helsingfors
    - 1st Finnish Rifle Regiment
    - 2nd Finnish Rifle Regiment
    - 3rd Finnish Rifle Regiment
    - 4th Finnish Rifle Regiment
  - 2nd Finnish Rifle Brigade, HQ in Vyborg
    - 5th Finnish Rifle Regiment
    - 6th Finnish Rifle Regiment
    - 7th Finnish Rifle Regiment
    - 8th Finnish Rifle Regiment

==== 1916 ====
The structure of the corps after its 1916 reorganisation was:

- 22nd Army Corps
  - 6th Ugletsky Orenburg Ataman Cossack Regiment
  - 8th Orenburg Cossack Regiment
  - 30th Separate Don Cossack Squadron
  - 22nd Mortar Artillery Division
  - 22nd Sapper Battalion
  - 1st Finnish Infantry Division
    - 1st Finnish Rifle Artillery Brigade
    - 1st Brigade
      - 1st Finnish Rifle Regiment
      - 2nd Finnish Rifle Regiment
    - 2nd Brigade
      - 3rd Finnish Rifle Regiment
      - 4th Finnish Rifle Regiment
  - 2nd Finnish Infantry Division
    - 3rd Finnish Rifle Artillery Brigade
    - 1st Brigade
      - 9th Finnish Rifle Regiment
      - 10th Finnish Rifle Regiment
    - 2nd Brigade
      - 11th Finnish Rifle Regiment
      - 12th Finnish Rifle Regiment

== Commanders ==
Divisional Commanders

- 1905—1905; Lieutenant General Ivan Makarovich Dzhambakurian-Orbeliani
- 1905—1906; LtGen Anton Egorovich Saltz
- 1906—1908; LtGen, later General of Cavalry Vladimir Alexandrovich Bekman
- 1908—1912; LtGen, later General of Infantry Peter Smitrievich Olkhovsky
- 1913—1917; LtGen, later General of Infantry Alexander Freidrikhovich Brinken
- 1917—1917; LtGen Nikolai Afruchev
- 1917—1917; LtGen Alexander Alekseevich Bezkrovny

== Assignments ==
Imperial Russian Army

Assignments of the corps during the First World War included;

- 1914—1914; 9th Army
- 1914—1915; 10th Army
- 1915—1915; 8th Army
- 1915—1915; 11th Army
- 1915—1917; 7th Army
- 1917—1917; Western Front
