= 16th Army Corps (Russian Empire) =

- Country: Russian Empire
- Allegiance: Imperial Russian Army
- Engagements: World War I; Battle of the Vistula River; Battle of Galicia

The 16th Army Corps was an Army corps in the Imperial Russian Army.

== Composition ==
- 41st Infantry Division
- 45th Infantry Division
- 47th Infantry Division
- 5th Cavalry Division

== Part of ==
- 4th Army: 1914 - 1915
- 2nd Army: 1915
- 4th Army: 1915
- 7th Army: 1915 - 1917
- 8th Army: 1917

== Commanders ==
- 12.01.1897 — 01.01.1903 : Mikhail Batyanov
- 05.03.1911 — 17.03.1911 : Leonid Artamonov
- 31.03.1911 — 13.10.1914 : Platon Geisman
- 13.10.1914 — 13.12.1915 : Vladislav Klembovsky
- 13.12.1915 — 08.10.1916 : Sergei Savvich
- 16.10.1916 — 02.04.1917 : Vladimir Dragomirov
- 02.04.1917 — 10.09.1917 : Nikolai Stogov
