= Adrian Usov =

Russian general (1868–1917)

Adrian Vladimirovich Usov
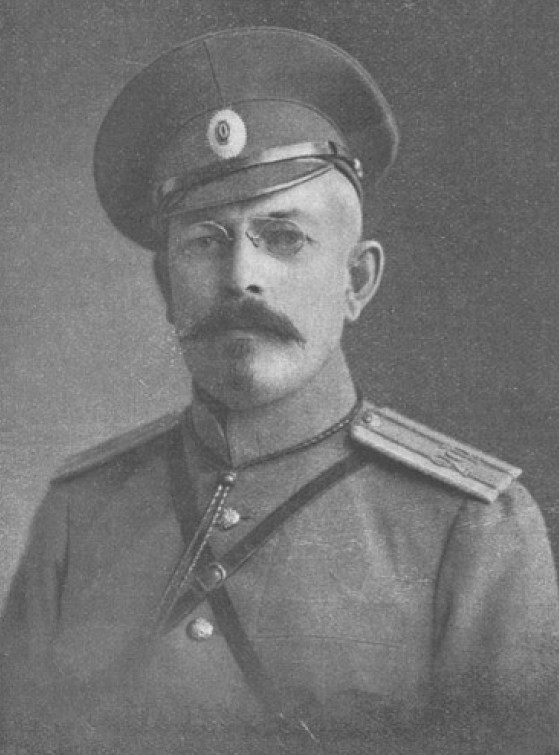
- Born: 8 June [O.S. 27 May] 1868
- Died: c. 22 August 1917
- Military career
- Allegiance: Russian Empire
- Branch: Imperial Russian Army
- Service years: 1886–1917
- Rank: Major General
- Commands: 2nd Finnish Rifle Regiment; 3rd Guards Infantry Regiment; 22nd Infantry Division
- Conflicts: Russo-Japanese War; World War I

Adrian Vladimirovich Usov (Russian: Адриа́н Влади́мирович У́сов; 8 June [O.S. 27 May] 1868 – no earlier than 22 August 1917) was a Major General of the Imperial Russian Army who participated in the Russo-Japanese War and World War I. He was a Knight of St. George.

== Biography ==
Usov came from the nobility of the St. Petersburg Governorate. He received his secondary education at the 3rd St. Petersburg Gymnasium. On 31 August 1886 he entered the Mikhailovsky Artillery School, after which on 10 August 1889 he was promoted to second lieutenant in the 8th Horse Artillery Battery with an assignment to the Guards Horse Artillery Brigade, to which he was transferred the following year. In 1893 he was promoted to lieutenant of the guard.

In 1892 he entered the Nikolaev Academy of the General Staff. After completing the 1st category of the additional course at the academy on 20 May 1895, “for excellent success in science,” he was promoted to staff captain of the guard. Assigned to the General Staff for the Kyiv, and later for the Warsaw Military District.

On 9 August 1896, he was transferred to the General Staff and renamed captain of the General Staff and appointed chief officer for special assignments at the headquarters of the 5th Army Corps. On 6 May 1898, he was appointed senior adjutant at the headquarters of the 6th Cavalry Division. To familiarize himself with combat service, from 17 October 1897 to 17 October 1898, he commanded a squadron in the 39th Narva Dragoon Regiment.

On 9 April 1900, he was promoted to lieutenant colonel of the General Staff and appointed as a staff officer for special assignments at the headquarters of the 14th Army Corps, but on 19 May he was transferred to the same position at the headquarters of the 2nd Caucasian Army Corps. On 24 November 1901, he was appointed as a staff officer for special assignments under the commander of the troops of the Caucasian Military District. From 10 May to 10 September 1904, “to become familiar with the general requirements of management and housekeeping,” he was seconded to the 27th Kyiv Dragoon Regiment.

On 20 November 1904, he was appointed acting chief of staff of the consolidated Caucasian Cossack division. On 6 December 1904, he was promoted to colonel of the General Staff with confirmation as chief of staff. In April 1905, as part of the division, he arrived at the theater of military operations of the Russo-Japanese War. He served as chief of staff of Pavel Mishchenko's detachment, and from September 1905 temporarily commanded the 1st Kizlyar-Grebensky Regiment of the Terek Cossack Army from his division. For distinguished service during the war, he was awarded two orders with swords.

After returning from the Far East and the disbandment of the consolidated division, he was appointed chief of staff of the 28th Infantry Division on 10 May 1906. On 22 February 1907, he was appointed chief of staff of the 3rd Cavalry Division, and on 17 July of the same year, he was appointed chief of staff of the 23rd Infantry Division. To fulfill the combat qualification, from 20 May to 20 July 1907, he was assigned to the artillery, and from 1 May to 31 August 1908, he commanded a battalion in the 90th Onega Infantry Regiment.

On 13 December 1908, he received command of the 2nd Finnish Infantry Regiment. On 24 September 1913, he was promoted to major general of the General Staff and appointed commander of the Life Guards of His Majesty's 3rd Infantry Regiment, at the head of which he entered World War I.

On 3 January 1915 he was awarded the Order of St. George, 4th Class.

By the same order dated 3 January 1915, he was awarded the Golden Weapon for Bravery.

On 17 December 1915, he was appointed commander of the 1st Brigade of the Guards Rifle Division and on 29 October 1916, he was appointed commander of the 22nd Infantry Division. On 22 August 1917, he was removed from his post and enlisted in the reserve of ranks at the headquarters of the Dvina Military District.

== Family ==
Was married. Son - Boris, ensign of the Guards Horse Artillery, participant in the White Movement in the ranks of the Armed Forces of Southern Russia, was evacuated in 1920 and lived in exile in Prague.

== Awards ==
- Order of St. Stanislaus, 3rd Class, 1898; 2nd Class with swords, 1906; 1st Class with swords, January 1915
- Order of St. Anne, 3rd Class, 1902; 2nd Class with swords, 1906; 1st Class with swords, 10 May 1915
- Order of St. Vladimir, 4th Class, 1908; 3rd Class, 6 December 1911; swords for the Order of St. Vladimir, 3rd Class, 15 January 1915; swords and bow for the Order of St. Vladimir, 4th Class, 11 June 1915; Order of St. Vladimir, 2nd Class, with swords, 26 November 1916
- Order of St. George, 4th Class, 3 January 1915
- Golden Weapon for Bravery, 3 January 1915

== Literature ==
- Адриан Владимирович Усов // Разведчик. Журнал военный и литературный. — Пг., 1915. — No. 1264. — С. 1.
- Военная хроника // Русский инвалид : газета. — 1915. — 10 января (No. 8). — С. 3.
- Список Генерального штаба. Исправлен по 1 июня 1914 г. Петроград: Военная типография Императрицы Екатерины Великой (в здании Главного штаба). 1914. p. 256.
- Альбом кавалеров ордена Св. Великомученика и Победоносца Георгия и Георгиевского оружия (Издание Общества кавалеров ордена Св. Георгия и Георгиевского оружия ed.). Белград. 1935. p. 141.
- Волков С. В. (2002). Офицеры российской гвардии: Опыт мартиролога. М.: Русский путь. p. 493. ISBN 5-85887-122-4.
