= Aleksandr Rittikh (general) =

Russian general

Aleksandr Fyodorovich Rittikh
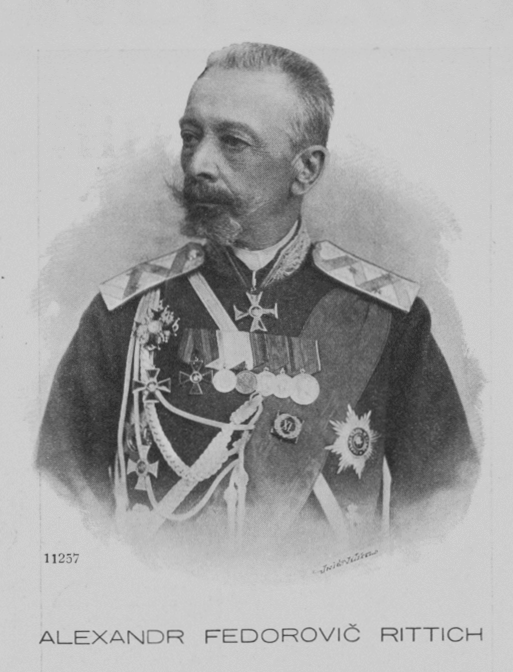
- Aleksandr Fyodorovich Rittikh in 1901
- Born: 1831
- Died: 22 June 1915 (aged 83–84)
- Military career
- Allegiance: Russian Empire
- Branch: Imperial Russian Army
- Rank: lieutenant general
- Unit: 22nd Infantry Division (Russian Empire)

Aleksandr Fyodorovich Rittikh or Alexander Rittich (Russian: Алекса́ндр Фёдорович Ри́ттих) (1831 — 22 June 1915) was an Imperial Russian general, cartographer, ethnographer and journalist, adherent of the Panslavism. Father of Aleksandr Aleksandrovich Rittikh.

== Works ==
- "Atlas of population of the West Russian region of confessions" 1862-1864
- "The ethnographic map of the Slavic peoples" (St. Petersburg, 1874),
- "Ethnographic Map of European Russia" (St. Petersburg, 1875),
- "The ethnographic map of the Caucasus" (St. Petersburg, 1875),
- "Slavic world" (text and 42 maps, Warsaw, 1885),
- "Materials for the Ethnography of the Kingdom of Poland: Lublin province, and the August" (St. Petersburg, 1864),
- "Materials for the Ethnography of Russia: Kazan Province" (Kazan, 1870),
- "Materials for the Ethnography of Russia: the Baltic Region" (St. Petersburg, 1875),
- "Austria-Hungary, the overall statistics" (St. Petersburg, 1874),
- "Aperçu général des travaux ethnographiques en Russie pendant les trente dernières annees" (Kharkov, 1878),
- "The numerical ratio of the sexes in Russia" (Kharkiv, 1879),
- "Ethnographic sketch of the Kharkov province" (Kharkiv, 1879),
- "Removal" (Kharkiv, 1882),
- "The Jewish question in Kharkov" (Kharkiv, 1882),
- "Ce que vaut la Russie pour la France" (Paris, 1887)
- "The Russian military life" (St. Petersburg, 1893)
- "Russian trade and navigation in the Baltic Sea" (St. Petersburg, 1896)
- "The Slavs in the Varangian Sea" (St. Petersburg, 1897)
- "Czechia and Czechs" (St. Petersburg, 1897)
- "Current issues of nobility" (St. Petersburg, 1897)
- "French-Slavic Congress in Paris in 1900" (St. Petersburg, 1899)
- "Eastern Question" (political-ethnographic essay, St. Petersburg, 1898)
- "Four lectures on Russian Ethnography" (St. Petersburg, 1895)

Military offices
Preceded by	Chief of Staff of the 22nd Infantry Division; 1866-1868	Succeeded by
