= 54th Infantry Division (Russian Empire) =

- 54-я пехотная дивизия
- Active: 1914–1918
- Country: Russian Empire
- Branch: Russian Imperial Army
- Role: Infantry

The 54th Infantry Division (Russian: 54-я пехотная дивизия, 54-ya Pekhotnaya Diviziya) was an infantry formation of the Russian Imperial Army.

== Organization ==
- 1st Brigade
  - 213th Infantry Regiment
  - 214th Infantry Regiment
- 2nd Brigade
  - 215th Infantry Regiment
  - 216th Infantry Regiment
- 54th Artillery Brigade
