= Anton Yegorovich von Saltza =

Russian general (1843–1916)

Baron Anton Yegorovich von Saltza
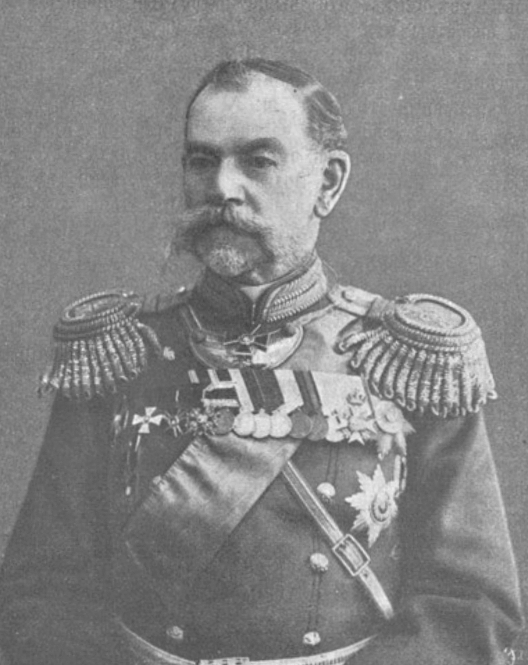
- General Anton Yegorovich von Saltza.
- Born: 22 October 1843; Luga, Saint Petersburg Governorate, Russian Empire
- Died: 9 February 1916 (aged 72); Petrograd, Russian Empire
- Military career
- Allegiance: Russian Empire
- Branch: (Russian Empire) Russian Imperial Army
- Service years: 1862-1916
- Rank: General of the Infantry
- Commands: 22nd Army Corps (1905-1906); 1st Army Corps (1906-1908); Kazan Military District (1911-1914,1914-1916); 4th Army (WW1 in 1914)
- Conflicts: January Uprising; Russo-Turkish War; World War I
- Awards: See below

Baron Anton Yegorovich Zaltsa (Russian: Анто́н Его́рович За́льца, tr. Antón Egórovič Zál’ca; 22 October 1843 – 9 February 1916), better known as Baron Anton Yegorovich von Saltza, was a Russian general of Baltic German origin who was the commander of the Kazan Military District, he was also one of the commanders of the Russian Army during the early stages of First World War.

== Biography ==
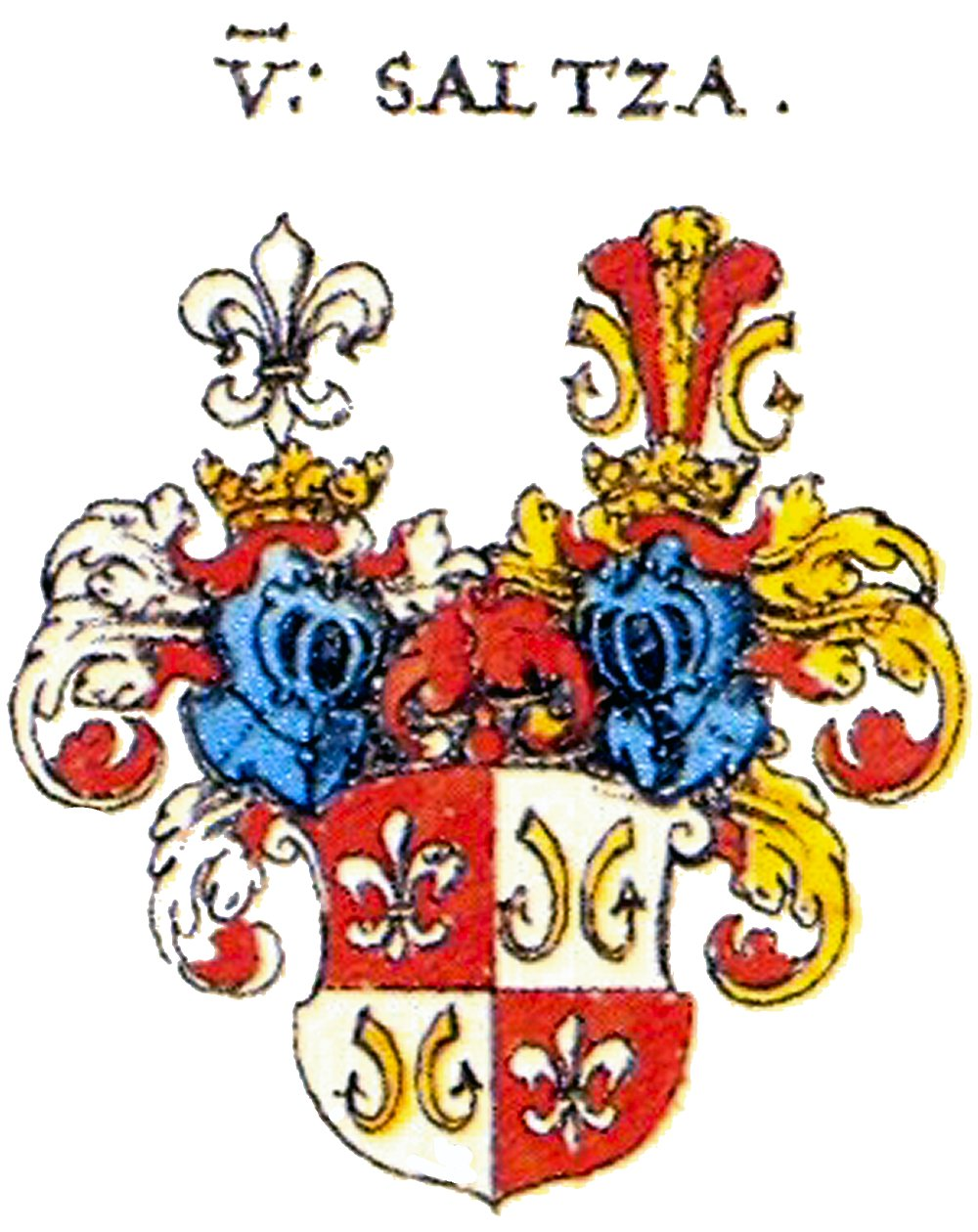
Coat of Arms of the Saltza Family

Saltza was born on 22 October 1843 in Luga, in the Saint Petersburg Governorate, to the Baltic German von Saltza family of Senator Baron Georg Reinhold Frommhold von Saltza and a Russian woman Alexandra Brosina.

Upon graduation in 1862, he was enlisted into a Life-Guards 4th The Imperial Family's Battalion, which led him into the suppression of the Polish uprising. After the uprising, he was awarded the Order of St. Stanislaus of the 3rd degree and the Order of St. Anna of the 4th degree with the inscription “For Bravery”. In late August 1867, Saltza was promoted to second-lieutenant, first-lieutenant in mid-April 1869. And in late August 1874, exactly 7 years after his promotion to second lieutenant, he was promoted to captain, he was also awarded the Order of St. Anna of the 3rd degree.

In mid-December 1876, Saltza served at the Caucasus Military District at the disposal of the commander of the military district, Grand Duke Mikhail Nikolayevich. After that he participated in the Russo-Turkish War. After the war, for military distinction and exploits, Saltza was awarded the Order of St. George of the 4th degree, the highest military decoration of the Russian Empire.

In retribution for the difference rendered in the case against the Turks, on 1 January 1878, when temporarily commanded by 1 rifleman of His Imperial Highness Grand Duke Mikhail Nikolayevich battalion, attacked three times the strongest enemy and carried away the battalion by personal example, seized the mountain of Aji-Alma and stayed on busy positions

In early February 1878, he rose to lieutenant-colonel, he was also awarded the Gold Sword for Bravery in 1877, the Order of St. Stanislaus of the 2nd degree with swords and a bow and Order of St. Vladimir of the 4th degree with swords and a bow, both were awarded in 1878. In 1878, Saltza was made adjutant under Grand Duke Mikhail Nikolayevich, and in early February 1879, he was appointed the commander of the 1st Caucasus Rifle Battalion, in which there he was awarded the Order of St. Anna of the 2nd degree and the Order of St. Vladimir of the 3rd degree in 1883. From mid-June 1889 to mid-April 1902, he was the commander of several regiments and battalions. During his time as commander, he was awarded the Order of St. Stanislaus of the 1st degree in 1898. In mid-April 1902, he was promoted to lieutenant-general and was appointed the commander of 24th Infantry Division. From 1904 to 1905, he commanded the 1st Guards Infantry Division, and from 1905 to 1908, he had commanded two army corps, the first one being the 22nd Army Corps, and the second being the 1st Army Corps. In mid-April 1908, he was promoted to General of the Infantry, and became the assistant commander of the Kiev Military District, under the commander-in-chief Lieutenant-General Vladimir Sukhomlinov, and later General Nikolai Ivanov. In early February 1911, he was appointed the commander-in-chief of all the troops of the Kazan Military District.

=== First World War ===
With the outbreak of the First World War, the Imperial Russian 4th Army was formed, after which Saltza was appointed commander-in-chief of the army. During the early stages of the Battle of Galicia, his troops along with General Ivanov was defeated at Kraśnik in their own Russian soil. After this failure, Saltza was replaced by General Aleksei Evert. Later in which he returned to his old post as the commander-in-chief of the Kazan Military District and became a member of Alexander Committee on the wounded. In early November 1914, he was appointed the commandant of the Peter and Paul Fortress, there in early December, he was awarded the Order of St. Alexander Nevsky. Among other of his decorations, he was awarded the Order of St. Anna of the 1st degree in 1904, the Order of St. Vladimir of the 2nd degree in 1906 and the White Eagle in early December 1911. General Saltz died on 9 March 1916 in Petrograd, but the location of his remains remained unknown.

== Honours and awards ==
- Order of St. Stanislaus, 3rd class (1863)
- Order of St. Anna, 4th class (1863)
- Order of St. Anna, 3rd class (1873)
- Gold Sword for Bravery (1877)
- Order of St. George, 4th class (1878)
- Order of St. Stanislaus, 2nd class (1878)
- Order of St. Vladimir, 4th class (1878)
- Order of St. Anna, 2nd class (1883)
- Order of St. Vladimir, 3rd class (1888)
- Order of St. Stanislaus, 1st class (1898)
- Order of St. Anna, 1st class (1904)
- Order of St. Vladimir, 2nd class (1906)
- Order of the White Eagle (1911)
- Order of St. Alexander Nevsky (1914)
