= Ivan Iosifovich Yakubovsky =

Russian general (1838–1911)

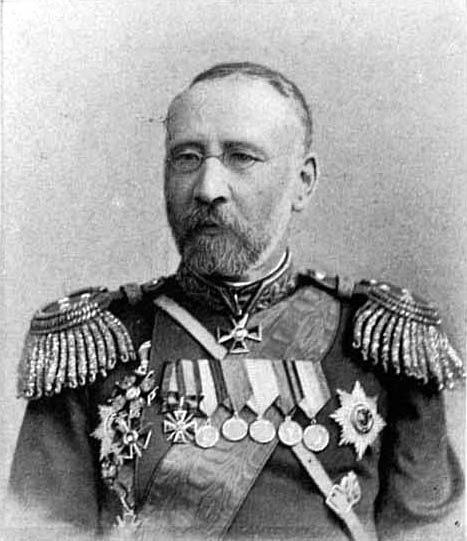
- Born: July 21, 1838
- Died: 1911 (aged 72–73)
- Military career
- Allegiance: Russian Empire
- Branch: Imperial Russian Army
- Unit: 22nd Infantry Division (Russian Empire)
- Commands: Volinsky Regiment
- Conflicts: Russo-Turkish War

Ivan Iosifovich Yakubovsky (July 21, 1838 – 1911) was a general from infantry, member of the Military Council of the Russian Empire.

== Biography ==
Born on July 21, 1838, came from noblemen of the Ekaterinoslav province.

He was educated at the Polotsk Cadet Corps (1856) and the Pavlovsk Military School, from which he was graduated on June 30, 1858, as a warrant officer in the Life Guards Finnish Regiment, and was seconded to the Nikolaev Engineering Academy on October 17, 1860.

On January 13, 1861, he was promoted to headquarters captains and assigned to serve in the headquarters of the Separate Guard Corps, and then subsequently served in the 9th, 17th and 3rd reserve rifle battalions.

On May 9, 1864, promoted to captain and the following year he entered the Nikolaev Academy of the General Staff. At the end of the course, on October 28, 1867, for his excellent achievements in science, he was promoted to majors with the appointment to the headquarters of the Finnish Military District.

On July 30, 1868, he was transferred to the General Staff as captain, with the remainder of the headquarters of the Finnish Military District and the appointment of Assistant Senior Adjutant. January 2, 1871 appointed for assignments at the headquarters of the Finnish Military District; March 21, 1872 he was appointed senior adjutant and April 16 of the same year promoted to lieutenant colonel. April 13, 1875 received the rank of colonel.

On February 23, 1876, he was appointed chief of staff of the 14th Infantry Division.

During the Russian-Turkish war of 1877-1878 he was in the army; when crossing the Danube near Zimnitsa, he participated in the battle at the Sist highs and during the capture of Sistov. Then, being in the detachment of Lieutenant General Radetzky, he took part in all battles at Shipka, as well as during the capture on December 28 of the entire army of Wessel Pasha; with the same detachment he crossed the Balkans and, at the conclusion of the San Stefano Peace, returned to Russia. For military distinctions in the last campaign he was awarded a golden saber with the inscription "For courage" and the orders of St. Anne of the 2nd degree with swords, St. 3rd degree Vladimir with swords and 4th degree with swords and bow.

On May 8, 1879, he was appointed chief of staff of the 22nd Infantry Division. From February 10, 1884, he commanded the 72nd Tula Infantry Regiment, and on October 1, 1886, he was entrusted with the Life Guards Volyn Regiment, whose commander was approved on April 5, 1887, along with the award of the rank of major general to him.

On April 16, 1891, he was appointed chief of staff of the 13th Army Corps, in which he served only until January 13, 1892, and then successively held positions: first assistant chief of staff of the Moscow Military District, and from December 12, 1892, until his appointment Member of the Military Council - Assistant to the Chief of Military Educational Institutions. During this time, he corrected the position of the chief of military educational institutions several times, participated in the work of the commissions: to review the staff of the main departments of the military ministry, to develop a new position for the Finnish cadet corps and chaired the commission to discuss issues of lump sum costs caused by the increase in staff cadets of the Mikhailovsky Artillery School. On May 14, 1896, promoted to lieutenant general.

He was appointed a member of the Military Council on January 15, 1900. The generals from Infantry produced December 6, 1906. Since 1905, he was a permanent member of the pedagogical committee of the Main Directorate of military schools. On January 1, 1911, he formally dismissed a member of the Military Council with a uniform and pension, but the next day he was reassigned to the service with the appointment to be a Minister of War and enlisted in the General Staff and Life Guards of the Volyn Regiment.

Minister of War A.F. Rediger characterized Yakubovsky as "honest and truthful."

He died in St. Petersburg in the fall of 1911, was excluded from the lists on November 4.

== Awards ==
Among other awards, Yakubovsky had orders:

- Order of St. Anne of the 3rd degree (1869)
- Order of St. Stanislav 2nd degree (1874)
- Golden saber with the inscription "For courage" (August 4, 1877)
- Order of St. Vladimir of the 4th degree with swords and bow (1877)
- Order of St. Anne of the 2nd degree with swords (1878)
- Order of St. Vladimir 3rd degree with swords (1879)
- Order of St. Stanislav 1st degree (1891)
- Order of St. Anne 1st degree (December 6, 1894)
- Order of St. Vladimir, 2nd degree (December 6, 1899)
- Order of the White Eagle (December 6, 1904)
- Order of St. Alexander Nevsky (August 30, 1908)

Preceded by	Chief of Staff of the 22nd Infantry Division (Russian Empire); 1879-1884	Succeeded by
Preceded by	Commander of the Volinsky Regiment; 1886-1891	Succeeded by

== Sources ==
- Volkov S.V. Generality of the Russian Empire. Encyclopedic dictionary of generals and admirals from Peter I to Nicholas II. Volume II L — I. - M., 2009. - S. 821. - ISBN 978-5-9524-4167-5
- The highest orders of the War Department. To No. 1055 of the "Scout". - S. 1, 4.
- Glinotsky N.P. Historical outline of the Nikolaev Academy of the General Staff. Lists of honorary presidents, honorary members, persons belonging to the administrative and educational units and all officers who completed the course of the Imperial Military Academy and the Nikolaev Academy of the General Staff from 1832 to 1882. - St. Petersburg, 1882 .-- S. 151.
- Ismailov E.E. Golden weapon with the inscription "For courage." Lists of gentlemen 1788–1913. - M., 2007. - S. 294, 524.— ISBN 978-5-903473-05-2
- Ponomarev V.P., Shabanov V.M. Cavaliers of the Imperial Order of St. Alexander Nevsky, 1725-1917: bio-bibliographic dictionary in three volumes. Volume 3. - M., 2009. - S. 1047. - ISBN 978-5-89577-145-7
- Rediger A.F. History of my life. Memoirs of the Minister of War. T.2. - M., 1999. - S. 238. - ISBN 5-87533-115-1
- List to the generals by seniority. Compiled on June 1, 1911 - St. Petersburg, 1911. - S. 64.
- Centenary of the War Ministry. 1802–1902. T. III, Dep. IV. Zatvornitsky N. M. Memory of the members of the Military Council. - SPb., 1907. - 678–679.
