= 71st Infantry Division (Russian Empire) =

- 71-я пехотная дивизия
- Active: 1904–1905; 1914–1918
- Country: Russian Empire
- Branch: Russian Imperial Army
- Type: Reserve
- Role: Infantry
- Size: approx. 20,000
- Engagements: Russo-Japanese War; World War I

The 71st Infantry Division (Russian: 71-я пехотная дивизия, 71-ya Pekhotnaya Diviziya) was a reserve infantry formation of the Russian Imperial Army. It was mobilized twice, in 1904–1905 for the Russo-Japanese War and in 1914–1918 for World War I.

== Organization ==
- 1st Brigade
  - 281st Infantry Regiment
  - 282nd Infantry Regiment
- 2nd Brigade
  - 283rd Infantry Regiment
  - 284th Infantry Regiment

== Commanders ==
- 1904-1906: Eduard Ekk
