= Kazan Military District =

Former military district of the Russian Empire and the Soviet Union

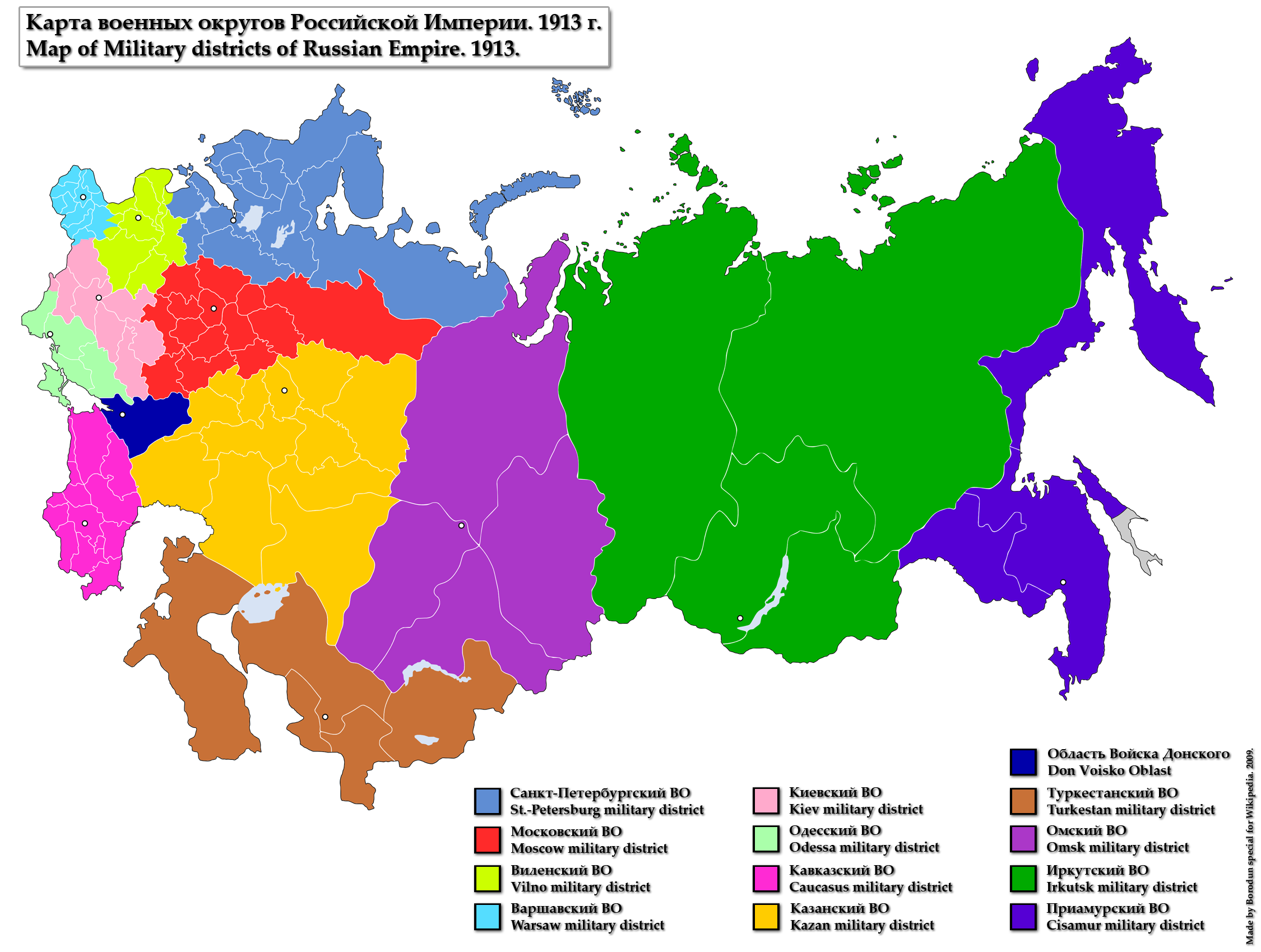
Kazan Military District in Orange

The Kazan Military District was a military district of the Russian Empire and the Soviet Union, which existed between 1864—1918 and 1945–1946.

== History ==
The Kazan Military District was originally formed as a military district of the Russian Empire by a decree dated August 6, 1864. It included the territories of Kazan, Perm, Vyatka, Penza, Simbirsk, Saratov, Samara and Astrakhan provinces. Its headquarter was situated in Kazan. In 1881, it included the territory of the abolished Orenburg military district. The Astrakhan, Ural and Orenburg Cossack troops were subordinate to the command of the district.

By a decree of March 30, 1918, the district was disbanded (in fact, the disbandment process continued until May 1918). In accordance with the decree of the Council of People's Commissars of the RSFSR dated May 4, 1918, the territory of the former Kazan Military District was divided between two newly created districts: the Volga Military District and the Ural Military District with headquarters in Samara and Yekaterinburg, respectively.

The Kazan Military District was formed a second time directly after the Second World War on July 9, 1945. The territory of the district included the Kirov region, as well as the Tatar, Udmurt, Mari and Chuvash ASSRs. The district administration was formed on the basis of the field administration of the 48th Army. The headquarters of the district was also stationed in Kazan.

By order of February 4, 1946, the district was reorganized into the Kazan territorial district, and the troops were transferred to the Volga Military District. The Kazan Military district was again abolished on May 6, 1946.

== Commanders ==
=== 1864-1918 ===
- Adjutant General, Lieutenant General Roman I. Knorrig (1864-1865)
- General of Infantry Konstantin R. Semyakin (1865 - February 1867)
- General of Infantry Boris G. Glinka-Mavrin (February 21, 1867 - April 16, 1872)
- General of Infantry Andrei O. Brunner (1872 - May 25, 1882)
- General of Infantry Gregory V. Mescherinov (May 25, 1882 - August 26, 1901)
- General of Infantry Andrei I. Kosich (September 15, 1901 - October 25, 1905)
- General of Infantry Ivan A. Karass (December 7, 1905 - September 23, 1907)
- General of Infantry Aleksandr G. Sandetsky (September 24, 1907 - February 7, 1912)
- General of Infantry Baron Anton Yegorovich von Saltza (February 7, 1912 - October 18, 1914)
- General of Infantry Platon A. Geisman (January 6 - August 8, 1915)
- General of Infantry Aleksandr G. Sandetsky (August 8, 1915 - March 1917)
- General of Infantry Alexander Myshlayevsky (March - June 1917)
- Colonel Pavel A. Korovichenko (July - October 1917)
- Lieutenant General Filipp N. Dobryshin (October - November 1917)
- Ensign Nikolai Ye. Ershov (November 1917 - May 1918)

=== 1945-1946 ===
- Colonel General Nikolai Gusev (July 1945 - June 1946)
