= Vladimir Dragomirov =

Russian general (1867–1928)

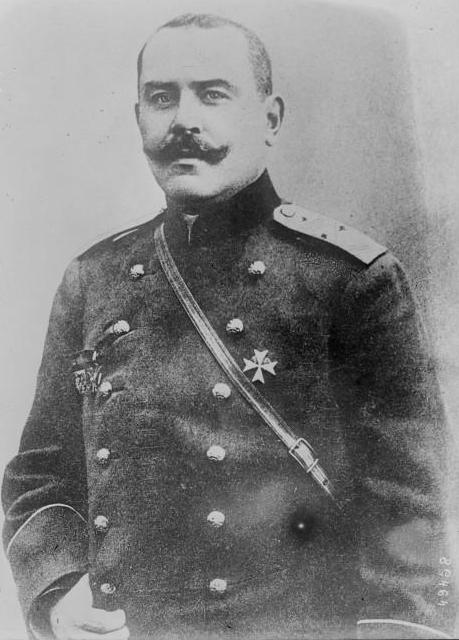
- Vladimir Dragomirov
- Born: February 7, 1867
- Died: January 29, 1928 (aged 60) Zemun
- Allegiance: Russian Empire
- Branch: Russian Imperial Army
- Rank: General
- Commands: Russian Imperial Army
- Conflicts: World War I

Vladimir Mikhailovich Dragomirov (Russian: Влади́мир Миха́йлович Драгоми́ров; February 7, 1867 – January 29, 1928) was a general in the Imperial Russian Army.

== Life ==
Dragomirov was the son of Mikhail Ivanovich Dragomirov, a prominent Russian General. His brother Abram Dragomirov was also a general in the Imperial Russian Army.

Dragomirov joined the Imperial Army and in 1909 was appointed District Quartermaster for the Kiev Military District, with the rank of major general. He served as a general in the Russian army for most of the First World War. During the mobilization on July 19, 1914, he was appointed Chief of Staff of the Third Army. Dragomirov commanded the 8th Army Corps from 16.12.1914 to 23.03.1915 and again from 18.08.1915 to 16.10.1916. In between those two periods, Dragomirov served as Chief of Staff of the South-Western Front.

On 12 May 1915, he was dismissed due to "nervous exhaustion." After a period of sick leave, he was transferred on the 16th of October 1916 to the post of commander of the 16th Army Corps. After the February Revolution, he was transferred to the reserve on April 2, 1917, and dismissed from service on August 22, 1917.

Following the Bolshevik October Revolution of 1917, Dragomirov aligned himself with the counter-revolution and took part in the Bredovsky expedition. After the defeat of the White forces in the Russian Civil War, he went into exile in Yugoslavia. He was a member of the regimental association of the Life Guards of the Semyonovsky Regiment, and served as chairman of the Russian Society of Officers of the General Staff. He died of heart disease in Zemun (Yugoslavia) on January 29, 1928, where he was buried.
