= Aleksandr Rittikh =

Russian politician (1868–1937)

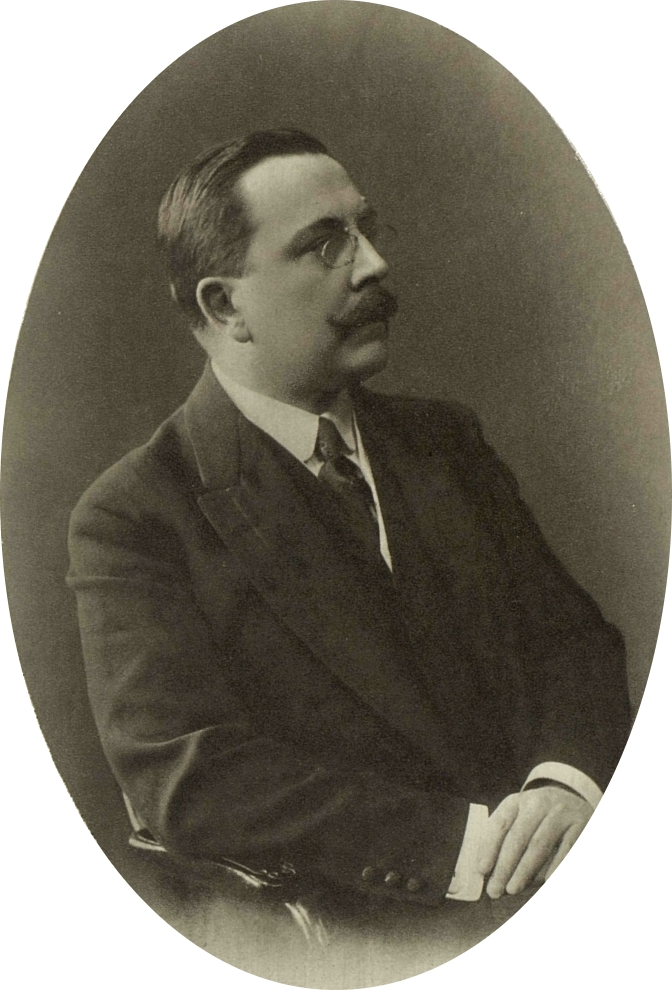
Aleksandr Aleksandrovich Rittikh

Aleksandr Aleksandrovich Rittikh or Alexander Rittich (Russian: Алекса́ндр Алекса́ндрович Ри́ттих) (27 September 1868, Kazan – 15 June 1937, London) was a politician of the Russian Empire, appointed on 29 November 1916, becoming the last imperial Minister of Agriculture (Ministry of Cultivation of the Russian Empire (1915–1917)).

He was the son of Aleksandr Fyodorovich Rittikh. He was described as a diligent worker known for his perseverance, sense of duty, and accurate, clear reports.

He was responsible for organizing the state requisitioning of grain faced by a scissor crisis in 1916, whereby the accelerated inflation of manufactured goods compared to agricultural goods led many peasants to remove their grain from the market. This measure, often associated with the later Bolshevik regime, where it was known as prodrazvyorstka, was implemented originally by the Imperial Russian Government. His work in trying to resolve the food crisis is highly praised by Aleksandr Solzhenitsyn in The Red Wheel, March 1917 node.

During the February Revolution along with Nikolai Pokrovsky he tried unsuccessfully to negotiate with representatives of the Imperial Duma.

In 1918 he lived in Odessa. In 1919 he emigrated to England, where he became director of a Russian Bank in London. In 1920 Alexander Krivoshein offered him a post in the Government of South Russia, operating in the Crimea under General Pyotr Nikolayevich Wrangel, but Rittikh refused.

He is buried in Beckenham Cemetery.
