= Abram Dragomirov =

Russian general (1868–1955)

Abram Mikhailovich Dragomirov
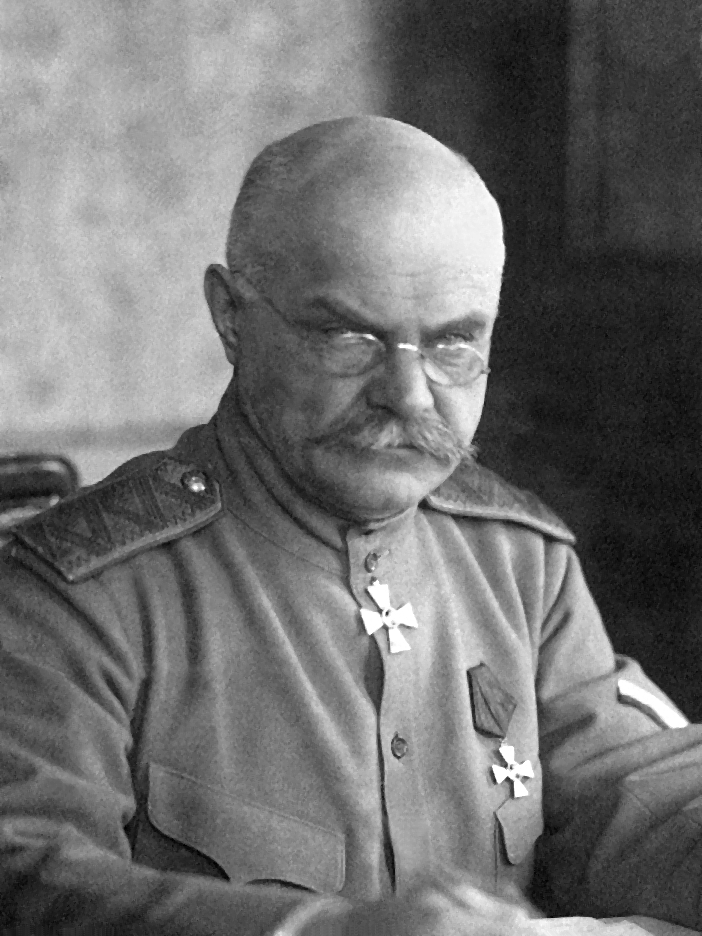
- Born: 21 April [O.S. 9] 1868; Chernigov, Chernigov Governorate, Russian Empire
- Died: December 9, 1955 (aged 87); Paris, France
- Military career
- Allegiance: Russian Empire; White movement Committee for the Liberation of the Peoples of Russia
- Branch: (Russian Empire) Imperial Russian Army (Russian Empire) Armed Forces of South Russia; Russian Liberation Army
- Service years: 1884–1945
- Rank: General of the Cavalry
- Units: Semyonovsky Regiment; 2nd Caucasus Cavalry Division
- Commands: 9th Army Corps; 5th Army; Kiev Army Corps
- Conflicts: World War I; Northern Front; Russian Civil War; World War II

Abram Mikhailovich Dragomirov (Russian: Абра́м Миха́йлович Драгоми́ров, tr. Abrám Michájlovič Dragomírov; Ukrainian: Абрам Михайлович Драгомиров; 21 April [O.S. 9] 1868 – 9 December 1955) was a General in the Imperial Russian Army. Following the Russian Revolution he joined Anton Denikin in the Volunteer Army.

== Youth ==
He was the son of Russian General Mikhail Dragomirov and brother of Vladimir Dragomirov.

In 1902–1903, he was chief of staff of the 7th Cavalry Division, and later of the 10th Cavalry Division. In 1912 he became commander of the Kaunas Fortress.

== First World War ==
He started the war at the head of the 2nd Cavalry Brigade and in December 1914 became as a General head of the 16th Cavalry Division. He led the 9th Army Corps in 1915–1916, the 5th Army between August 1916 and April 1917 and the Northern Front until June 1917.

== Russian Civil War and exile ==
According to Peter Kenez, "Before coming to the Kuban, General Dragomirov had been working with Shulgin in various anti-Bolshevik activities in Kiev." He became the third most powerful man in the Volunteer Army after Denikin and Mikhail Alekseyev. In October 1918, he became the chairman of the Special Council.

After the defeat of the White Army, he was evacuated to Constantinople. He moved to Serbia and in 1931 to France.

Dragomirov joined Andrey Vlasov's pro-German Russian Liberation Army during World War II.

He lived the last 10 years of his life in France and was buried in the Sainte-Geneviève-des-Bois Russian Cemetery.
