= Mikhail Dragomirov =

Russian general

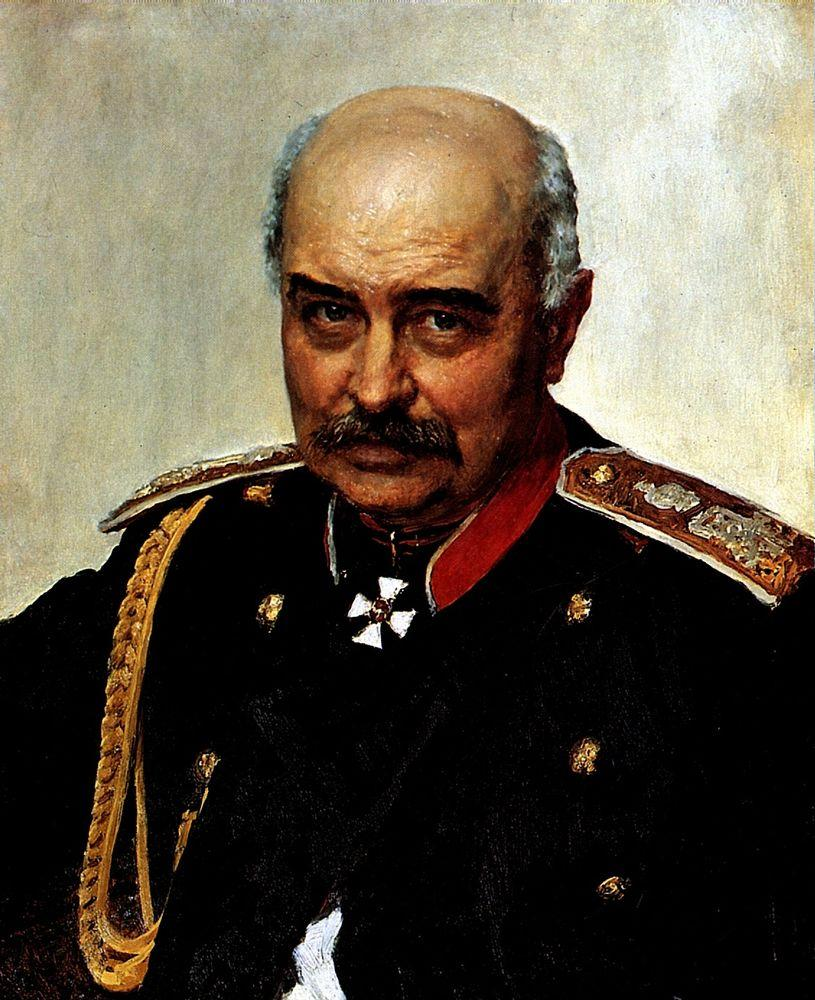
- Portrait by Ilya Repin
- Born: 20 November 1830; Konotop, Chernigov Governorate, Russian Empire
- Died: 28 October 1905 (aged 74); Konotop, Chernigov Governorate, Russian Empire
- Military career
- Allegiance: Russian Empire
- Branch: (Russian Empire) Imperial Russian Army
- Service years: 1849–1905
- Rank: General of the Infantry
- Conflicts: January Uprising; Austro-Prussian War; Russo-Turkish War; Battle of Svistov; Battle of Shipka Pass (WIA); Siege of Plevna; Russo-Japanese War
- Awards: Legion of Honour, Grand Cross; Order of St. Andrew; Order of St. George; Order of St. Vladimir; Order of Saint Anna; Order of the Cross of Takovo

Mikhail Ivanovich Dragomirov (Russian: Михаи́л Ива́нович Драгоми́ров, Ukrainian: Михайло Драгомиров; 20 November [O.S. 8 November] 1830 – 28 October [O.S. 15 October] 1905) was a Russian Imperial general and military writer of Ukrainian origin. His grandfather Ivan Antonovych Dragomirecki-Mockewicz after being granted a noble title in 1786, changed his name from Dragomirecki to the Russified form of Dragomirov.

== Army career ==
=== Training and staff positions ===
Dragomirov entered the Guard infantry in 1849, becoming second lieutenant in 1852 and lieutenant in 1854. In the latter year he was selected to study at the Nicholas Academy (a staff college), and here he distinguished himself so much that he received a gold medal, an honor which, it is stated, was awarded to a student of the academy only twice in the 19th century. In 1856, Dragomirov was promoted to staff-captain and in 1858 to full captain, being sent in the latter year to study the military methods in vogue in other countries. He visited France, England, and Belgium, and wrote voluminous reports on the instructional and manoeuvre camps of these countries at Châlons, Aldershot, and Beverloo. In 1859, he was attached to the headquarters of the King of Sardinia Victor Emmanuel II during the campaign of Magenta and Solferino, and immediately upon his return to Russia he was sent to the Nicholas Academy as professor of tactics.

Dragomirov played a leading part in the reorganization of the educational system of the army, and acted also as instructor to several princes of the imperial family. This post he held until 1863, when, as a lieutenant colonel, he took part in the suppression of the Polish insurrection of 1863-1864, returning to St. Petersburg in the latter year as colonel and chief of staff to one of the Guard divisions. During the Austro-Prussian War of 1866, Dragomirov was attached to the headquarters of the Second Prussian army. He was present at the battles on the upper Elbe and at Königgrätz, and his comments on the operations which he witnessed are of the greatest value to the student of tactics and of the war of 1866.

=== Military service ===
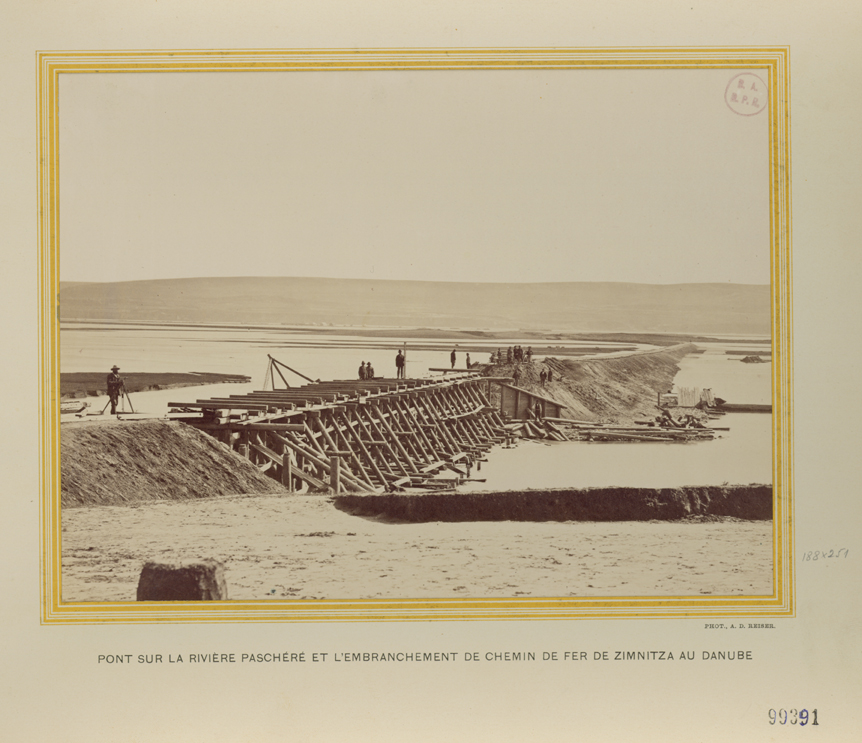
The crossing of the Danube at Zimnitza, circa 1877

In 1868, he was made a major general, and in the following year became chief of staff in the Kiev military circumscription. In 1873, Dragomirov was appointed to command the 14th division, and in this command he distinguished himself very greatly in the Russo-Turkish War, 1877–1878. The 14th division led the way at the crossing of the Danube at Zimnitza; Dragomirov being in charge of the delicate and difficult operation of crossing and landing under fire, and fulfilling his mission with complete success. Later, after the reverses before Plevna, he, with the cesarevich and Generals Eduard Totleben and Dmitry Milyutin, strenuously opposed the suggestion of the Grand Duke Nicholas that the Russian army should retreat into Romania, and the demoralization of the greater part of the army was not permitted to spread to Dragomirov's division, which retained its discipline unimpaired and gave a splendid example to the rest.

He was wounded at the Shipka Pass, and, though promoted lieutenant general soon after this, was not able to see further active service. He was also made adjutant general to the tsar and chief of the 53rd Volhynia regiment of his old division. For eleven years thereafter General Dragomirov was chief of the Nicholas Academy, and it was during this period that he collated and introduced into the Russian army all the best military literature of Europe, and in many other ways was active in improving the moral and technical efficiency of the Russian officer-corps, especially of the staff officer. In 1889, Dragomirov became commander-in-chief of the Kiev Military District, and governor general of Kiev, Podolia and Volhynia, retaining this post until 1903. He was promoted to the rank of general of the infantry in 1891.

His advanced age and failing health prevented his employment at the front during the Russo-Japanese War of 1904–1905, but his advice was continually solicited by the general headquarters at St. Petersburg, and while he disagreed with General Kuropatkin in many important questions of strategy and military policy, they both recommended a repetition of the strategy of 1812, even though the total abandonment of Port Arthur was involved therein. Dragomirov died at Konotop on 28 October 1905. In addition to the orders which he already possessed, he received in 1901 the Order of St. Andrew.

== Works on military organization ==
His larger military works were mostly translated into French, and his occasional papers, extending over a period of nearly fifty years, appeared chiefly in the Voienni Sbornik and the Razvedschik; his later articles in the last-named paper were, like the general orders he issued to his own troops, attentively studied throughout the Russian army. His critique of Leo Tolstoy's War and Peace attracted even wider attention. Dragomirov was, in formal tactics, the head of the orthodox school. His conservatism was not, however, the result of habit and early training, but of deliberate reasoning and choice. His model was, as he admitted in the war of 1866, the British infantry of the Peninsular War, but he sought to reach the ideal, not through the methods of repression against which the advanced tacticians revolted, but by means of thorough efficiency in the individual soldier and in the smaller units. He inculcated the offensive at all costs, and the combination of crushing short range fire and the bayonet charge. He carried out the ideas of Suvorov to the fullest extent, and many thought that he pressed them to a theoretical extreme unattainable in practice. His critics, however, did not always realize that Dragomirov depended, for the efficiency his unit required, on the capacity of the leader, and that an essential part of the self-sacrificing discipline he exacted from his officers was the power of assuming responsibility. The details of his brilliant achievement of Zimnitza suffice to give a clear idea of Dragomirov's personality and of the way in which his methods of training conduced to success.

== Cultural role ==
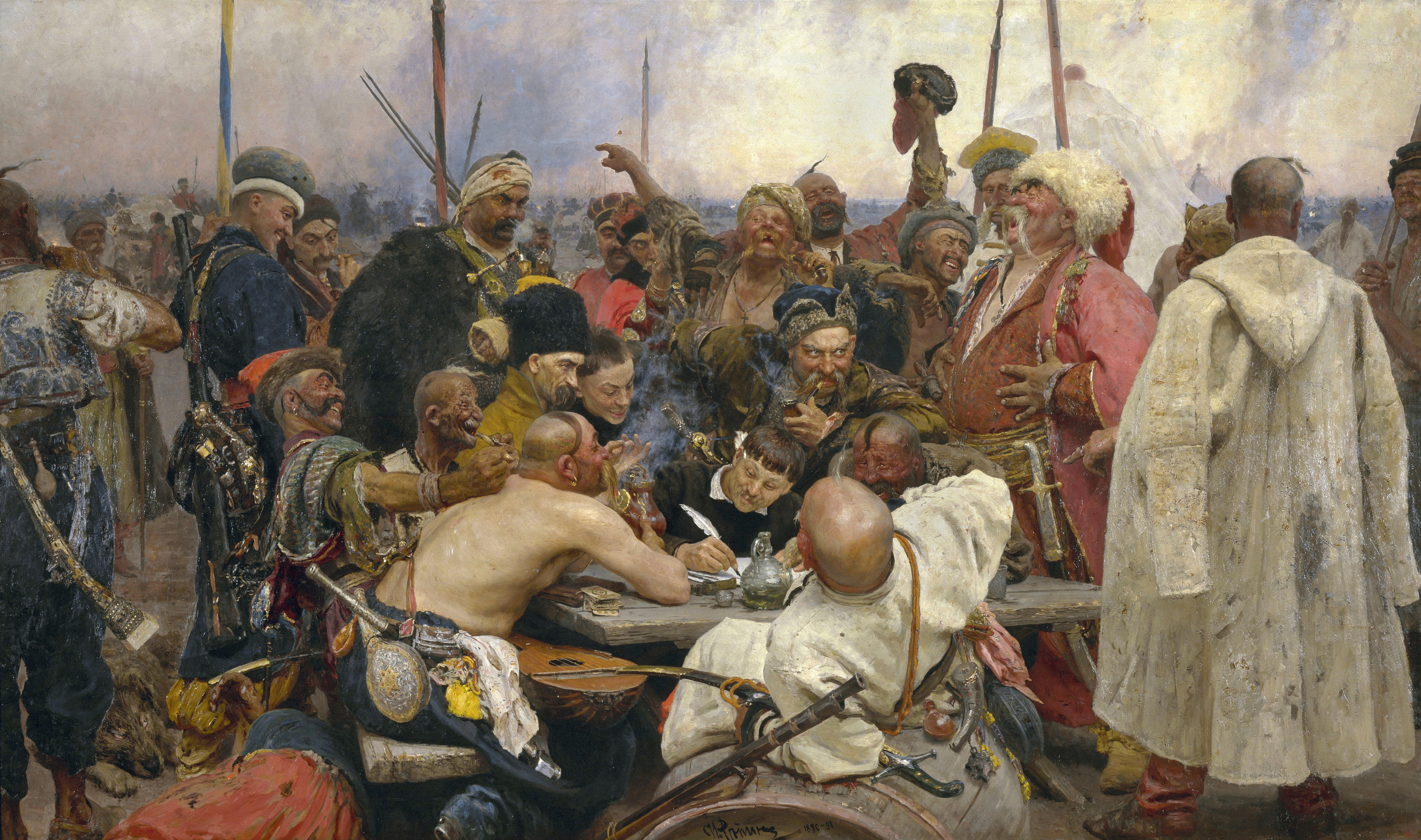
Dragomirov as a Cossack chieftain (center) in a painting by Ilya Repin

Dragomirov was a friend of the painter Ilya Repin, and posed in the center of one of Repin's most famous paintings, Reply of the Zaporozhian Cossacks. He portrays one of the leaders of the Cossacks as they allegedly drafted a highly-insulting letter to the Turkish sultan. Repin also painted a more formal portrait of Dragomirov, found at the top of this article.

Known for his Ukrainophile views, Dragomirov was an associate of Volodymyr Antonovych and Pavlo Zhytetsky. He contributed to the development of Ukrainian literature and theatre by helping Ukrainian authors to evade censorship.

== Family ==
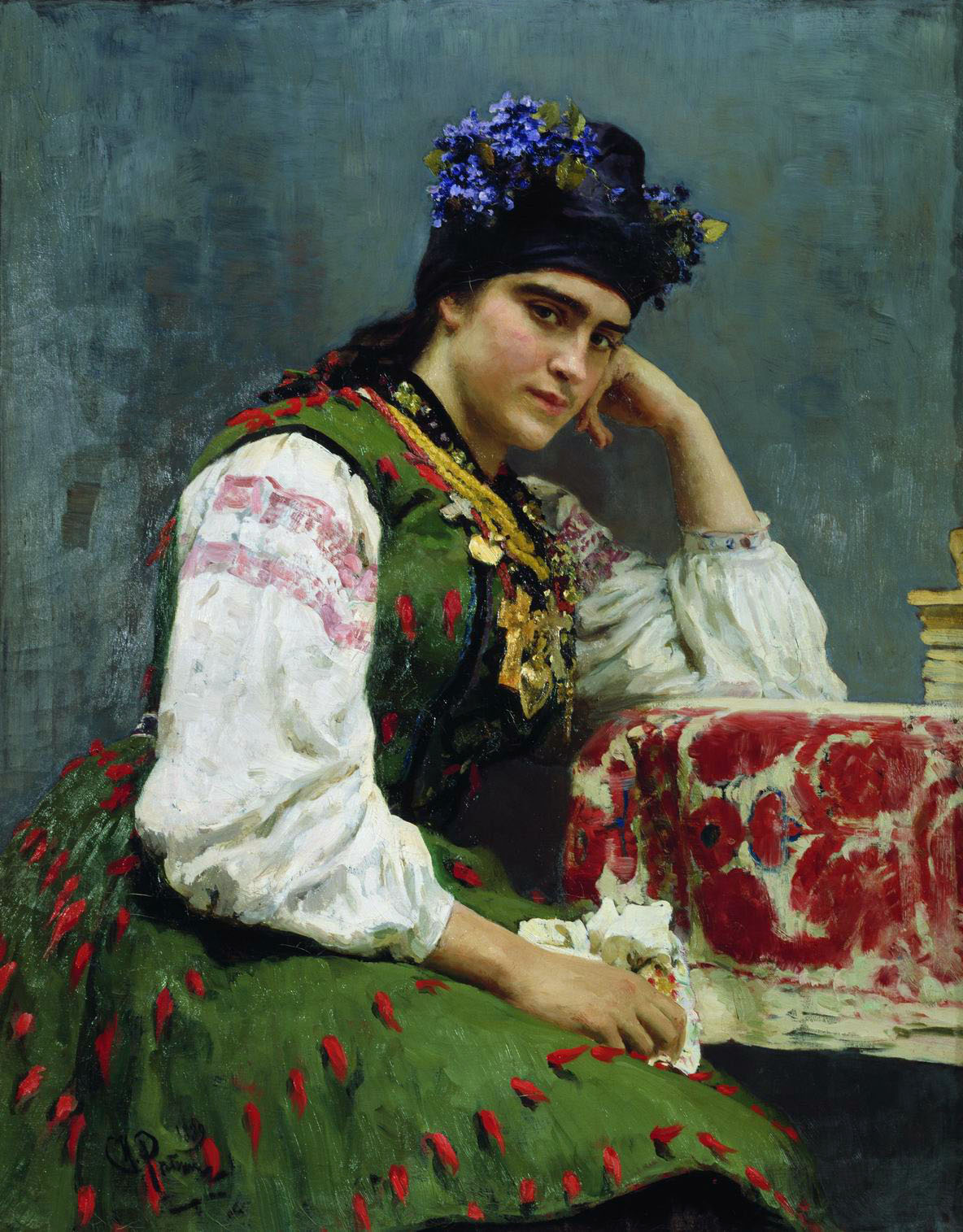
The portrait of Dragomirov's daughter Sofia, by Ilya Repin

He had two sons who entered the military:

- Lieutenant-General Vladimir Mikhailovich Dragomirov (1867–1928)
- General of Infantry Abraham Mikhailovich Dragomirov (1868–1955)

He also had a daughter, Sofia.

Preceded by Aleksei Ignatiev	Governor-General of Southwestern Krai; 1898–1903	Succeeded by Nicholas Kleigels
