= 1st Army Corps (Russian Empire) =

1st Army Corps 1-й армейский корпус
- Active: 1810–1862; 1874–1917
- Country: Russian Empire
- Branch: Imperial Russian Army
- Size: Approximately 46,000
- HQ: Saint Petersburg
- Engagements: Napoleonic Wars; Russo-Turkish War of 1877–78; Russo-Japanese War; World War I: Battle of Tannenberg; Battle of Łódź (1914); Battle of the Vistula River

The 1st Army Corps (Russian: 1-й армейский корпус) was a formation in the Imperial Russian Army that was formed in 1810 as the 1st Infantry Corps. It took part in the Russo-Turkish War of 1877–78, and later, in August 1914, the 1st Army Corps fought as part of the Second Army in the Battle of Tannenberg. There, it was defeated by the Germans along with the rest of the Second Army. During the rest of World War I, it took part in other operations up until late 1917.

== Composition ==
The following is a list of units that made up the 1st Army Corps at different points during its existence:

1874:

- 1st Cavalry Division

1903:

- 22nd Infantry Division
- 37th Infantry Division
- 50th Reserve Infantry Brigade

1913:

- 22nd Infantry Division
- 37th Infantry Division
- 1st Mortar Artillery Division
- 1st Saper Battalion
- 7th Pontoon Battalion

1914:

- 22nd Infantry Division

1st Brigade

85th "Vyborksky" Infantry Regiment
86th "Vilmanstranski" Infantry Regiment

2nd Brigade

87th "Neishlotski" Infantry Regiment
88th "Petrovski" Infantry Regiment

22nd Artillery Brigade

- 24th Infantry Division

1st Brigade

93rd "Irkutski" Infantry Regiment
94th 'Eniceiski" Infantry Regiment

2nd Brigade

95th "Krasnoyarski" Infantry Regiment
96th "Omski" Infantry Regiment

24th Artillery Brigade

== Commanders ==
Officers that commanded the corps during its existence:

1st Army Corps commanders
Appointed	Commander	Dismissed
1 November 1876	Infantry General Alexander Petrovich Barklai de-Tolli-Veimarn	19 January 1888
19 January 1888	Infantry General Mikhail Pavlovich Danilov	26 May 1896
14 June 1896	General Adjutant Feofil Egorovich Meindorf	19 December 1905
19 December 1905	Lieutenant General Nikolay Iudovich Ivanov	11 June 1906
9 November 1906	Infantry General Anton von Saltza	8 June 1908
8 June 1908	Artillery General Vladimir Nikolayevich Nikitin	11 March 1911
17 March 1911	Infantry General Leonid Artamonov	18 August 1914
August 1914	Infantry General Leonid-Otto Ottovich Sirilius	?
6 October 1914	Lieutenant General Alexander Alexandrovich Dushkevich	13 April 1916
18 April 1916	Major General Vasily Timofeyvich Gavrilov	After 1 December 1916
December 1916	Lieutenant General Nikolai Ilyich Bulatov	April 1917
2 April 1917	Lieutenant General Alexander Sergeyvich Lukomsky	2 June 1917
June 1917	Lieutenant General Leonid Mitrofanovich Bolhovitinov	?

== See also ==
- List of Imperial Russian Army formations and units

== Sources ==
- General Staff, War Office (1996) [1st Pub. 1914]. Handbook of the Russian Army. London: Imperial War Museum. ISBN 0-89839-250-0.
