= 6th Army Corps (Russian Empire) =

- Active: 1877–1918
- Country: Russian Empire; Russian Republic
- Branch: (Russian Empire) Imperial Russian Army
- Size: ~20,000
- HQ: Łomża (until 1909), Białystok (after 1909)
- Engagements: Russo-Turkish War (1877–1878); World War I; Battle of Tannenberg; Battle of Łódź (1914)

The 6th Army Corps was an army corps in the Imperial Russian Army.

== Composition ==
- 4th Infantry Division
- 16th Infantry Division
- 4th Cavalry Division

== Part of ==
- 2nd Army: 1914
- 10th Army: 1914
- 1st Army: 1914
- 2nd Army: 1915
- 11th Army: 1917

== Commanders ==
- 1877: Vasily Fedorovich Rall
- 1878–1883: Christopher Roop
- 1889–1900: Alexei Kulgachev
- 1900–1901: Oskar Grippenberg
- 1904–1905: Arkady Skugarevsky
- 1906–1909: Nikolai Khitrovo
- 1909–1910: Konstantin Alekseev
- 1912–1914: Alexander Blagoveshchensky
- 1914: Pyotr Baluyev
- 1914–1916: Vasily Gurko
- 1916–1917: Aleksei Gutor
