= Second Brusilov offensive =

Component of World War 1

- Part of the Brusilov offensive of Eastern front
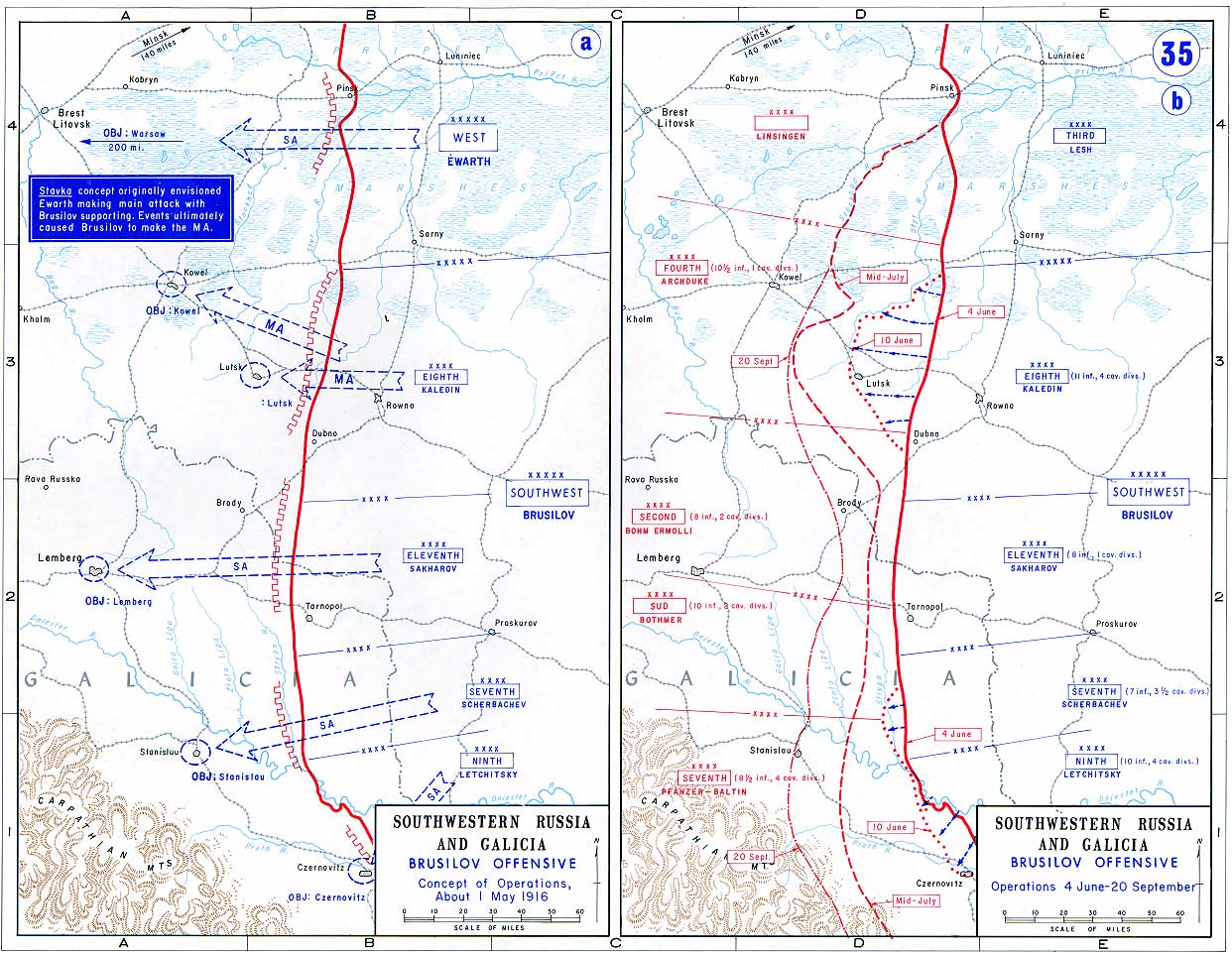
- First - Forth Brusilov offensives (May–September 1916)
Date	22 July – 21 August 1916
Location	Galicia, present-day western Ukraine
Result	Stalemate Full results: Styr offensive: Russian victory; First Stokhid offensive: Central powers victory; Battle of Khoshev: Russian victory; Battle of Svinuhy: Russian victory; Battle of Stanislav: German victory; Second Battle of Stanislav: Russian victory; Selets-Trysten offensive: Indecisive; Battle of Brody: Russian victory; Battle of Zbarazh: Russian victory; Battle of Zolota Lypa: Russian victory; August offensive: Central powers victory; Battle of Kowel: Central powers decisive victory; Crossing Gnila Lypa: Russian victory
Territorial changes	Russian capture of Brod, Galich, Stanislav, as well as Gnila Lypa, However, they failed to fulfill the main purpose of the operation

Belligerents
Russian Empire	Austria-Hungary; German Empire; Ottoman Empire

Commanders and leaders
Mikhail Alekseyev; Aleksei Brusilov; Alexey Kaledin; Vladimir Sakharov; Dmitry Shcherbachev; Mikhail Diterikhs	Paul von Hindenburg; Erich Ludendorff; Conrad von Hötzendorf; Joseph Ferdinand; Eduard von Böhm; Alexander von Linsingen; Felix von Bothmer; Cevat Pasha

Strength
933,336	580,048

Casualties and losses
312,000 casualties	127,000 captured

The Second Brusilov offensive took place in July–August 1916 on the Eastern Front during the First World War. As a result of the First Brusilov offensive in May–June 1916, the Imperial Russian army defeated the Austro-Hungarian troops and captured a large number of prisoners (up to 50% of the soldiers of the Austro-Hungarian army were of Slavic origin and did not want to fight against the Russian Empire). But Imperial German army came to the aid of its ally. In July 1916, all Austro-Hungarian troops were subordinated to Paul von Hindenburg and Erich Ludendorff and Hindenburg became commander-in-chief of the entire Eastern Front. The weakest sections of the Austro-Hungarian front were reinforced by German divisions, and most importantly, in the direction of the impending main attack of the Russian Southwestern Front (on Kovel), the defence was mainly occupied by German troops. The offensive was ambiguous, in central Galicia and on the Dniester, the Russians achieved decisive results, but the attacks on Kovel failed. At the same time, the Russians practically stopped losing soldiers captured and killed, but the central powers suffered losses mostly irretrievably.

== Background ==
On June 20, 1916, General of the cavalry Aleksei Brusilov subdued the arriving two fresh corps of the 8th Army and gave the order: the 3rd Army to capture Pinsk (this point was later canceled, since this army was part of the Western Front and had already been fighting for Pinsk since June 6), for the rest - “stop the general offensive and very firmly gain a foothold in the positions currently occupied, which are actively defended. Wherever possible, push forward the vanguards - cavalry to delay the advancing and pursue the retreating enemy,... just in case, prepare rear defensive positions". In the next two days, he demanded that it be reinforced with two corps and that all rifle cartridges produced in the country be placed at his disposal, threatening to abandon further offensive. Mikhail Alekseyev notified Brusilov: “For now, all the rifle cartridges produced by our factories are sent to your disposal, which amounts to 4 million daily. There is nowhere else to get more. The reserves of the Northern and Western Front are small. It is necessary to require particularly careful collection of abandoned ammunition on the battlefield.” By a directive from the Alekseyev of June 23, the 3rd Army, as well as the 5th Army Corps and the 78th Infantry Division, were transferred to the Southwestern Front.

Preparations for the new stage of the offensive were delayed due to ongoing attacks on the 8th Army. Now the Southwestern Front armies were supposed to facilitate the breakthrough of the Western Front armies to Baranovichi by attacking Kovel. The 9th Army continued its advance towards the Carpathians and reached the Prut River, but all attempts by Alekseyev to convince the headquarters of the Southwestern Front of the need to reinforce the troops of P. Lechitsky rested on a complete misunderstanding of the situation. Only on June 30 were the 117th Infantry Division from Crimea and the 108th Infantry and Ussuri Cossack Divisions from the Northern Front (25,000 soldiers) finally sent there. In addition, by this time the armies of the Southwestern Front had received about 50,000 marching reinforcements.

To deliver a new blow, the armies of the Southwestern Front (3rd, 8th, 11th, 7th and 9th) had more than 880,000 soldiers (55 infantry and 20 cavalry divisions, and 2 separate infantry brigades,) with 3,187 machine guns and 2,637 guns against 536,500 soldiers and 2,972 guns of the Austro-Hungarian and German troops (41 infantry and 12 cavalry divisions, and 6 separate infantry brigades). The 3rd Army (infantry general L. Lesh) allocated two cavalry divisions to the reserve, the 8th Infantry Division, rifle and cavalry brigades, the 7th Rifle Division, and the 9th Cavalry Division. The 11th Army had no reserves.

The Central Powers, unlike the first stage of the operation (First Brusilov offensive), did not have the opportunity to allocate large forces to the reserve. On July 3, only the Southern Army and the Army Group Alexander von Linsingen had reserves - an infantry division and a brigade of the Polish Legion, respectively. By this time, reinforcements had arrived from the German Eastern Front: the Bavarian Cavalry, 1st Reserve and 119th Infantry Divisions, 37th Infantry and 175th Landwehr Brigades (the latter deployed to the consolidated division of Lieutenant General H. von Clausius). The right flank of Linsingen (two infantry and cavalry divisions each) entered the army group of Prince Leopold of Bavaria, but due to the expansion of the front of the Russian 3rd Army, it also became involved in the battles for Polesie. To the north, the army group of Colonel General Remus von Woyrsch repelled the attack on Baranovichi by the 4th Army of the Russian Western Front. Near Kovel, new army groups of cavalry generals Friedrich von Bernhardi, Georg von der Marwitz and Eugen von Falkenhayn were created. In the Carpathians, a group of Lieutenant General R. von Kravel appeared as part of the 7th Army; command of the 4th Army was handed over to Colonel General K. Tershtyansky von Nadosh. Now E. von Falkenhayn assured the Austro-Hungarian command that with the help of the transferred German forces it was possible to prevent the Russians “from reaching a solution to the entire campaign, if only everyone in their place fulfils their duties”.

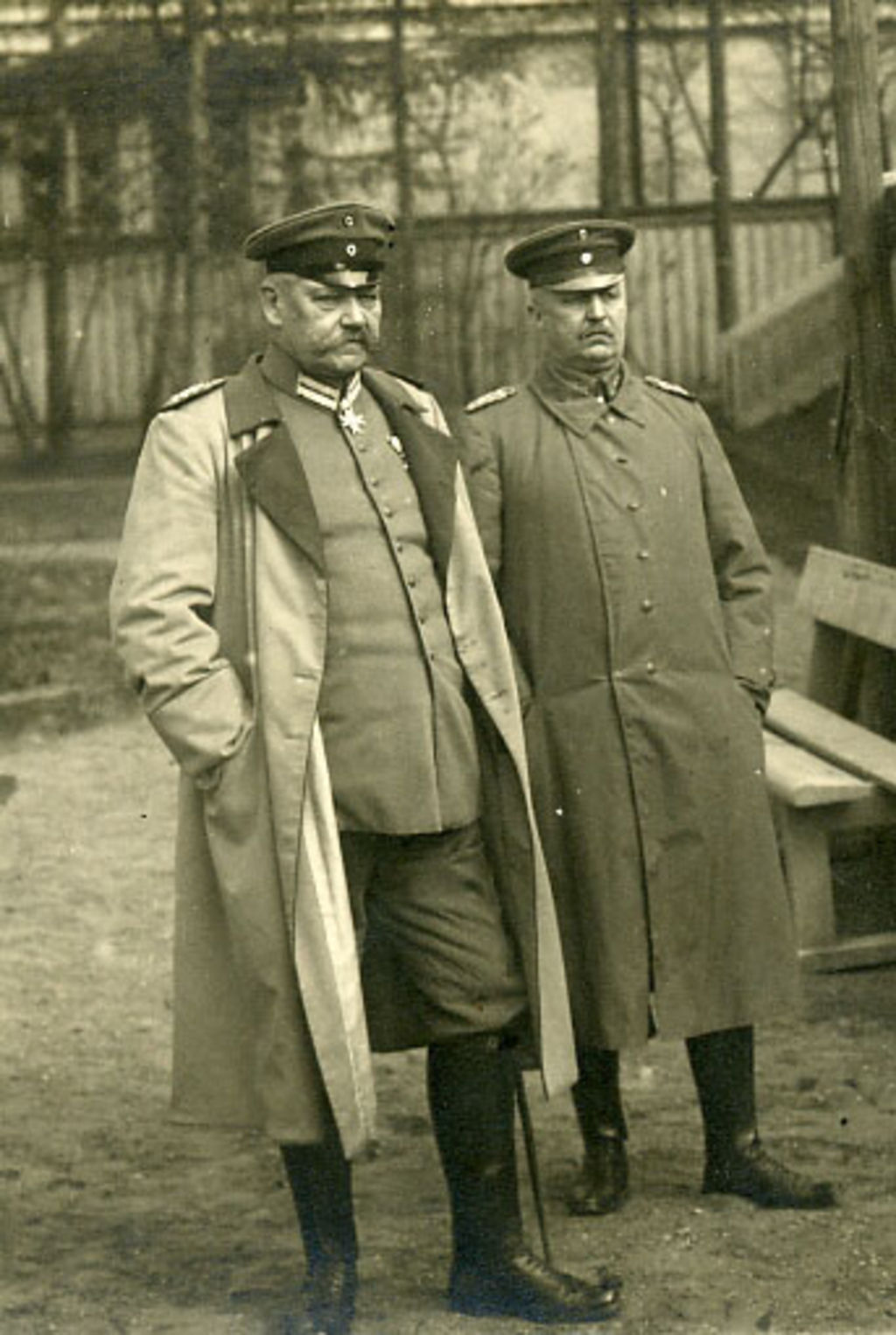
Hindenburg and Ludendorff in Kowno summer 1916

By July 4, the 3rd Army, which joined the Southwestern Front, consisted of the 31st and Combined Army Corps - a total of 4 infantry and 4 cavalry divisions. Part of the forces was transferred to it from the neighbouring 8th Army (two infantry and three cavalry divisions). It was the 3rd and 8th Armies (19 infantry and 10 cavalry division) that were involved in the battles for Kovel and Polesie; in many places they crossed the Stokhid River and established bridgeheads, but were unable to advance further.

The 9th Army (12 infantry and 4 cavalry divisions) crossed the Prut River and began advancing towards the main ridge of the Carpathians and the Hungarian administrative border. The two divisions that arrived in its composition could not have come at a better time, since the northern flank of the army was attacked by the German group of Kravel. On June 25, it was decided to send Lechitsky another 79th Infantry Division (14,000 soldiers) from the armies of the Russian Northern Front.

However, on June 25, Brusilov, in a conversation with Alekseyev, once again emphasised that he considered his immediate task to be “the capture of Kovel by actions from the south, east and north, after which I will send part of the forces to the rear of the Pinsk enemy group, if by that time it does not withdraw itself " The armies of the Western Front, in his opinion, will have to ensure this operation by occupying the Oginski Canal. Brusilov's opinion was supported by Emperor Nicholas II: “The main attack on Kovel, the front should take advantage of the reduction, apparently, of the enemy forces in the Pinsk region to push the enemy out of it, which would most fully achieve securing the right flank of the 3rd Army from the north and which would provide significant assistance operations of the Western Front".

According to Alekseyev's directive of July 9, 1916, the armies of the Southwestern Front were entrusted with the task of delivering the decisive blow to the campaign, and the neighbouring Western Front was supposed to not only distract the forces of the German army, but also allocate new troops to be transferred to Brusilov's offensive zone. However, the armies of the Southwestern Front were too drained of blood to take immediate decisive action. By the end of June, their combat losses reached half a million men. The Austro-Hungarian troops, reinforced by German reinforcements, on the new lines of defence still did not allow a deep breakthrough to the rear. Moreover, the Brusilov breakthrough took completely different forms: conceived as a means to delay the forces of the Central Powers from the site of the proposed general offensive, it began to absorb the supplies and reserves of other fronts, including the shock Western Front. One of the reasons for the failure at Baranovichi offensive was that the armies of the Western Front transferred 16 infantry and 7 cavalry divisions to Brusilov, and the shortage in the infantry increased by 80,000 soldiers.

On June 28, the chief of staff of the Southwestern Front, Vladislav Klembovsky, gave a directive to attack Kovel from July 14, the next day he moved the date to July 16, and then Alekseyev allowed to wait for the arrival of all forces and sent the 3rd Army to reinforce Brusilov's armies. Therefore, only the 11th Army (200,000 soldiers, 895 machine guns, 613 guns, 18 bomb launchers and an armoured train) was able to attack on July 16, which had the 45th Army Corps in reserve, which was almost immediately brought into battle. In the battle on the Styr and Lipa rivers, its troops (12 infantry and 3 cavalry divisions) pushed back the army group of G. von der Marwitz and the Austro-Hungarian 1st Army (together about 85,000 soldiers, 500 machine guns, 400 guns and an armoured train; 8 infantry and 3 cavalry divisions), and then moved forward near Berestechko, capturing a total of up to 27,000 prisoners, 40 guns, 36 mortars and 49 machine guns and losing 30,000 men. The Germans, to the aid of their allies - the Austro-Hungarians, threw into battle the army reserve - the German 108th Infantry Division. On the evening of July 25, the headquarters of the Austro-Hungarian 1st Army was disbanded, and the remnants of the troops (10,000 men) were poured into the 2nd Army of Böhm-Ermolli.

On July 2, the army of Adjutant General V. Bezobrazov was formed from the guard troops, the armies of the Southwestern Front received the 3rd Army Corps (transportation began on July 5–6, 25,500 soldiers, 89 machine guns, 81 guns), 4th Siberian Corps (in the 3rd Army since July 8, 30,000 soldiers, 114 machine guns, 105 guns) and two heavy artillery divisions with a supply of shells - again from the Western Front. The actions of the 9th Army in Bukovina and the 11th Army in Eastern Galicia were of particular importance, but Brusilov saw in them only a cover for preparing the main attack on Kovel. The transition to the offensive here was scheduled for July 23, the completion of the entire operation in a week, but due to rains the attack was postponed. This made it possible to gather more powerful forces. On July 12, the transportation of the 1st Siberian Corps (29,000 soldiers, 98 machine guns, 81 guns) to the South-Western Front began, and 150,000 marching infantry reinforcements arrived. The 11th Army (12 infantry and 3 cavalry divisions) on July 25 launched attacks near Brody on the group of Field Marshal-Lieutenant F. Kozak (43,000 men and 214 guns - consisting of Austro-Hungarian troops, staffed mainly by soldiers of Slavic nationalities) and defeated it in 4 days, capturing up to 14,000 prisoners, 40 machine guns and 9 guns. Russian losses amounted to about 17,000 men.

== General offensive of the Russian Southwestern Front, July 28 - August ==
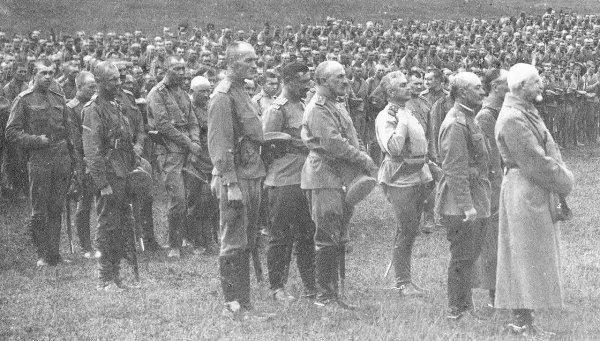
Russian soldiers listen to a priest before battle

On the main direction, the offensive was postponed until July 28. This prolonged operational pause allowed Hindenburg and Ludendorff to gather significant reserves. In two weeks, the 34th and 106th (Landsturm) Infantry Divisions, the headquarters of the Austro-Hungarian I and VIII Corps and the control of the 3rd Army from Tyrol arrived in the zone of the upcoming Russian offensive, subordinated together with the 7th Army to the newly created headquarters of the 12th Army of Field Marshal-Lieutenant Archduke Karl Franz Josef on July 4, the German 121st Infantry Division and the 2nd Jäger Brigade from France, the 10th Landwehr and 86th Infantry Divisions and the 9th Landsturm Brigade from Army Group Hindenburg. Some units were involved in the battles for Brody, the rest were used to create reserves. In the army group of Archduke Charles (22 infantry and 5 cavalry divisions, the Carpathian Corps (7th Army), an infantry division (3rd Army) and three regiments of the German Landsturm (Southern Army) were allocated to the reserve. The Army Group's reserve included a German infantry brigade. The 2nd Army (5 infantry divisions and a cavalry brigade), leading stubborn battles near Brody, had a cavalry brigade in reserve. In the Linsingen army group (27 infantry and 5 cavalry divisions), reserves were created in the von der Marwitz army group (infantry division), in the 4th Army (Landwehr brigade), in the Bernardi army group (division and two infantry brigades), as well as two infantry divisions directly at the disposal of Linsingen.

Unlike the Central Powers, the Russian armies had practically no reserves for developing an offensive. Platon Lechitsky was able to allocate only one infantry division to the reserve of the 9th Army (13 infantry and 5 cavalry), in the 7th and 11th Armies (together 24 infantry and 5 cavalry divisions) there were no reserves was completely, Alexey Kaledin (8th Army with 8 infantry and 3 cavalry divisions) and Bezobrazov (10 infantry and 3 cavalry divisions) left only cavalry in reserve - one and three divisions, respectively, Leonid Lesh (3rd Army with 15 infantry divisions and 7 cavalry divisions) intended to use the 1st Siberian Corps (two rifle divisions) that had not yet arrived to develop success.

In total, on July 28, 1916, the armies of the Russian Southwestern Front had 933,236 combat troops with 4,158 machine guns, 3,224 guns, 2 armored trains, as well as another 47,000 unarmed and 54,500 marching replenishment and reserves (60 infantry and 23 cavalry divisions). The Central Powers (Austro-Hungarian 12th and 2nd Armies, with the 3rd, 7th and Southern Armies subordinated first; Linsingen Army Group) had 580,040 combat troops, 3,096 machine guns, 3,446 guns and 8 armoured trains (49 infantry and 10 cavalry divisions). As at the beginning of the offensive of the Southwestern Front, Russian superiority in manpower was compensated by a large number of artillery and stronger reserves of the Central Powers. In addition, this time there were more German rather than Austro-Hungarian troops in reserve.

In the Kovel direction, three Russian armies went on the offensive, superior to the Germans in both manpower and artillery. However, the attacks by the enormous 3rd Army (15 infantry and 7 cavalry divisions - 7; 300,000 men) against the German groups of Leopold Freiherr von Hauer, Fat and Gronau (7 infantry and 6 cavalry divisions) were repulsed. More successful were the actions of the army of V. M. Bezobrazov (10 infantry and 3 cavalry divisions), whose corps were pushed aside by the German groups Friedrich von Bernhardi and Walther von Lüttwitz (8 infantry divisions) on Stokhod River. Already on the first day, the Central Powers brought army reserves into battle, and by August 1 - all the reserves of Linsingen's army group. An even more difficult test fell on the Austro-Hungarian 4th Army (five infantry and one cavalry division). The Russian 8th Army (8 infantry and 3 cavalry divisions) was unable to support the offensive of the Russian Imperial Guard, but it broke through the front of the Austro-Hungarian 4th Army in the direction of Vladimir-Volynsky. Linsingen was dissatisfied with the low resistance of the Ruthenian regiments, especially since he considered the attack of the 8th Army a diversionary maneuovre, and demanded that the 11th Division be removed to another front as completely unreliable. On the first day, troops of the 9th Army (13 infantry and 5 cavalry divisions) broke through the Central Power's defences at the junction of the Southern and 3rd Armies (together 20 infantry and 3 cavalry divisions) along the southern bank of the Dniester River. But Lechitsky was again left without reinforcements and feared for the weak, extended flank in Bukovina: already on July 30 he was forced to stop the offensive.

The new phase of the Southwestern Front offensive coincided with the meeting in Pless of the Emperors of Germany and Austria-Hungary. July 29 the decision was approved to subordinate all troops from the Baltic to Galicia, including the Austro-Hungarian 2nd Army, to Hindenburg. On July 30, the army group of artillery general Hans von Gronau was subordinated to the army group of Prince Leopold of Bavaria and reinforced by the 1st Landwehr Division. On August 3, Hindenburg took command of the Eastern Front and ordered to strengthen the defence of Kovel with the 75th Infantry Division and the 15th Turkish Corps. The front of the 4th Army was supposed to strengthen the regiment from the army of R. von Woyrsch, which successfully defended Baranovichi, and the headquarters of the 40th Army Corps, led by Infantry General K. Litzman. In just a short time, 456 trains with troops arrived at the front: the Carpathians were supposed to cover the 1st Infantry Division and the Alpine Corps. Infantry General E. von Falkenhayn, did not participate in the meeting due to illness, which was most likely of a diplomatic nature. He still feared for the front of the 2nd Army in Galicia and ordered the German 195th and 197th Infantry Divisions, newly formed in Poland, to be sent there. Hindenburg was forced to allocate the 3rd Landwehr Brigade from the German 8th Army (Courland) for the same purpose. In early August, Hindenburg and Ludendorff planned to strike Russian troops in Bukovina.

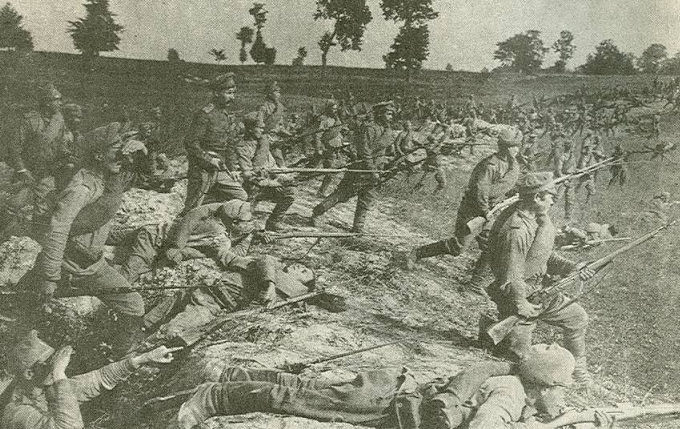
Russian infantry attack summer 1916

The army headquarters of the Southwestern Front was preparing new attacks. The 1st Siberian Corps, which arrived in the 3rd Army, replaced the 4th Siberian Corps, which suffered heavy losses and was withdrawn to the rear. From August 6, the latter was personally subordinated to the Supreme Commander-in-Chief, Emperor Nicholas 2, as the last reserve for developing the offensive. In general, Alekseyev was not satisfied with the progress of the battles near Kovel and in other areas. He telegraphed on July 20 to Klembovsky: "The reinforcements brought by the Germans, which managed to gain a fairly strong foothold in accidentally occupied positions, no longer make it possible to develop operations simultaneously with all armies on a wide front and require, in my opinion, the concentration of superior forces in some selected important areas. In general, the southwestern armies have on their side a superiority of forces of over 200,000 soldiers, which makes it possible to combine a strike, make a breakthrough and follow it up with work on the enemy’s flank and rear, avoiding costly exclusively frontal attacks, for the development of which there are no longer the means. According to this program of lack of concentration of forces, the 3rd Army led the attack, General Bezobrazov imitated it, the result was a state of powerlessness with a general superiority of forces. Again I turn to the 7th Army, which, for the benefit of the cause, could now allocate a corps to the 9th Army, with the help of which the victory of July 15 would receive widespread development and decisive significance. Work without gathering forces leads to slow development of the operation, loss of time, strengthening of enemy positions, large expenditure of shells and people... It is necessary to lay hands on the forces and means of one army to temporarily strengthen another and gather overwhelming forces in the intended direction".

Alekseyev's opinion was confirmed by the experience of the July battles: alone, the 11th Army achieved greater success than all the armies of the Southwestern Front while simultaneously striking the enemy. Nevertheless, on August 5, the Russians struck a new general blow. The 11th Army was the first to act again (12 infantry and 3 cavalry divisions), attacking the right flank of the Austro-Hungarian army E. von Böhm-Ermolli (five infantry and one cavalry divisions). The fighting lasted 10 days and was characterised by extreme tension. The Central Powers brought into battle the 34th Landwehr Brigade, the commander of the 11th cavalry general, V. Sakharov, the 32nd Army Corps and the 5th Siberian Corps, transferring them from the safer northern flank. Then Böhm-Ermolli carried out the same castling, but only two German divisions of Infantry General J. von Eben, who arrived from Lemberg and Kovel, were able to stop the further advance of the Russian troops.

On August 7, the huge 9th Army of P. A. Lechitsky (14 infantry and 5 cavalry divisions; 300,000 men) launched an offensive against Stanislavuv and Galich. The task was complicated by the fact that in the Carpathians, from August 2, against the left flank of the Austro-Hungarian army, the Austro-Hungarians went on the offensive with the forces of the fresh Carpathian Corps and pushed the Russian vanguards away from the mountain passes (Kirlibaba, Mygura, Yablunice). It was there that the reserve had to be sent - the 79th Division, which was preparing to support the breakthrough on the Dniester River. In the attack direction, Lechitsky concentrated about 100 thousand soldiers and up to 500 guns against 78,000 soldiers and 490 guns of the 3rd Army of the Infantry General H. Köves von Köwesshaza (9 infantry and two cavalry divisions - 2)71. The front was broken through at Tlumach, and within 4 days Russian troops reached the Bystrytsia Solotvynska River and took Stanisławów, 19,650 prisoners, 18 guns and 157 machine guns. On July 31, the Germans tried to turn the tide of the offensive and launched an attack near Zbrazh, but were overturned and defeated by the efforts of the Russian army.

The commander of 7th Army, Infantry General D. Shcherbachev, took advantage of his neighbour's success. At the strike line, he had an equal number of guns with the Austro-Hungarian army, and outnumbered him almost four times in manpower (the right flank of the Southern Army), but did not dare to attack until the breakthrough of the 9th Army forced the commander of the Southern Army, Colonel General Count F. von Botmer to bend his flank along the northern bank of the Dniester. On August 10, Shcherbachev (ten infantry and two cavalry divisions) brought the reserve into battle - the 22nd Army Corps, creating a five-fold superiority in infantry and gaining superiority in artillery. Throwing two reserve regiments into battle, Bothmer stopped the advance of the Russian troops, but was forced to retreat to Zborow, Brzezany and Galich, since both of his flanks were covered by the 11th and 9th Armies. To the latter, to develop the offensive, Shcherbachev transferred two infantry divisions, which had a significant impact on the development of the breakthrough on the Dniester. In total, the troops of the 7th Army took 8,581 prisoners, 4 guns and 19 machine guns73. The position of Archduke Charles' army group was becoming critical. The German 2nd Cavalry and 48th R Divisions and the Turkish 15th Corps (two infantry divisions), which had already assembled in Kovel, were sent to the Southern Army. On August 9, it was decided to send to the 3rd Army the 2nd Jäger Brigade from Silesia and the 103rd Reserve Brigade from France (they made up the 199th Division), as well as those withdrawn from the Battle of the Somme to replenish the 10th Bavarian and 117th Infantry Division. On August 14, the headquarters of the army group of Infantry General F. von Gerock arrived in Kalushch. These measures not only strengthened the enemy's positions north of the Dniester, but also allowed the Austro-Hungarian command to withdraw three divisions from this section of the front - one to the Italian theatre of operations and two to create a barrier against Romania.

In the Kovel direction, the 3rd Army brought the fresh 1st Siberian Corps into battle, but to no avail. The attacks of the armies of Bezobrazov and Kaledin were also unsuccessful. The positions around Kovel were occupied by German divisions, which were much more combat-ready than the Austro-Hungarian ones. For the first time during the fighting of the 1916 campaign, the Central Powers were able not only to repel all attacks and inflict huge losses on the Russian troops, but even to restore previously lost positions. In the German Army Group of Linsingen, a new method of creating tactical reserves began to be practiced: the most prepared regiments and battalions were selected from divisions, which were concentrated at key points behind the front line and brought into battle when there was a threat of a breakthrough of positions. This made it possible to use only four regiments out of three divisions of the army and front reserve. Russian army commanders were greatly concerned about the failures in the main direction, however, in parallel, Russian troops defeated the German Carpathian Corps, occupying the wooded Carpathians, conducted successful offensive operations on the Golden linden river, the offensive ended only after the 7th Army put the German Southern Army to flight and crossing the rotten linden.

== Casualties and losses ==
In total, the Second Brusilov offensive cost the armies of the Southwestern Front 312,000 men. During the same period, 51,000 men returned from hospitals and 136,500 arrived as marching reinforcements. The total losses of the Central Powers (taking into account the damage of troops operating against the armies of the Russian Northern and Western Fronts) since the beginning of the Brusilov offensive in May 1916 exceeded 483,000 men, the Russian armies of the Southwestern Front - 810,000 men, the armies of the North and Western Fronts - reached 480,000 men.

== Outcome ==
The results of the Second Brusilov offensive forced Alekseyev to have a different attitude towards the prospect of Romania acting on the side of the Entente. Success on the Dniester River could pose a threat to Hungary and Transylvania. If in winter Alekseyev rejected the project of the Supreme Council of the Entente to conduct an offensive operation specifically in the direction of the Carpathians and Romania, then on August 5 Alekseyev gave a directive to strengthen troops on the Deliatyn – Câmpulung front: “Romania’s attack against Austria can take place subject to the allied armies attacking Thessaloniki and maintaining not only a strong, stable position in Bukovina, but also the ability to go on the offensive. If Romania’s performance does not follow, a strong left wing is necessary to support the entire operation of the Southwestern Front.”

However, Brusilov was still more concerned with the capture of Kovel. On July 28, he asked to transfer the 4th Siberian Corps to him again: “I believe that achieving a major success here is necessary and certainly possible, provided that the Western and Northern Fronts do not allow further transfer of enemy troops to Kovel”. Here Brusilov was wrong: Hindenburg did not use forces from the army groups of Prince Leopold and Field Marshal E. von Eichhorn to repel attacks on Kovel. Using Brusilov's arguments about the desirability of attacking Kovel from the north, Alekseyev on July 30 issued a directive to transfer the armies of Bezobrazov and Lesh to the Northern Front for “energetic replenishment and a decisive attack on the enemy covering Kovel.” Three rifle divisions were transferred to Brusilov. He now had to “develop as widely as possible the success achieved by the 11th, 7th and 9th Armies, complete the disorder of the Austro-Hungarian armies and, if possible, separate the Austro-German troops operating on the Brody-Cârlibaba front from the main mass of the Germans concentrated on Kovel and Vladimir-Volynsk directions". The front of Brusilov's troops was now significantly reduced. For the first time since the beginning of his offensive, he did not receive, but gave troops (albeit, along with their line of responsibility) - 20 infantry and 8 cavalry divisions (more than 220,000 soldiers and 955 guns). They were opposed by 18 infantry and 8 cavalry divisions with significant artillery forces.

To develop the operation, the Southwestern Front received 24 infantry and 5 cavalry divisions as reinforcements and reserves, and together with the front sector, another 4 infantry and 4 cavalry divisions (3rd Army in June), in addition, 246,000 marching reinforcements arrived and 117,000 recovered from hospitals. The operation, which was initially of an auxiliary nature, already in the first month absorbed all strategic reserves of Imperial Russian Army and made it impossible for other fronts to conduct successful operations. Only one goal set by the April directive was achieved: the Central Powers were ousted from the fortified line that they occupied before the start of the offensive. There was no significant outflow of German troops from positions in front of the armies of the Russian Northern and Western fronts.

The Austro-Hungarian and German high command was seriously concerned about the situation on the Eastern (German) and Northern (Austro-Hungarian) fronts. At a meeting in Pless, German Emperor Wilhelm II declared to Emperor Franz Joseph: “The situation in the East seems to me so serious that it is necessary to discuss appropriate measures, to which I will then ask your consent.” The role of direct assistance by troops to the Northern Front of Austria-Hungary was especially emphasised by the then Chief of Staff of the Eastern Front E. Ludendorff: “Austria-Hungary fed on German blood and German material resources”. Until August 14, the Central Powers transferred 30 infantry and 3 cavalry divisions to the front south of Pripyat, two more infantry and two cavalry divisions took part in repelling the Brusilov breakthrough in connection with the expansion of the range of the armies of the Russian Southwestern Front. In addition, 260,000 marching reinforcements and more than 180,000 recovered from field hospitals and rear hospitals arrived in the troops. 5 infantry divisions departed from Archduke Charles' Army Group: one to Lithuania, one to Italy and three to Transylvania.

The transfer of new formations was facilitated by the fact that at this time the German divisions were switching from a brigade to a regimental structure. Thus, several transferred brigades were immediately deployed into new divisions, and some of them remained in the same place, which misled Russian intelligence. Not a single division was withdrawn from the front of the supposed initial Russian offensive (Smarhon – Krevo) until August. After repelling the attack on Baranovichi, the army group of Infantry General R. von Woyrsch gave only one division to its southern neighbours. In just two months, from the German troops opposing the armies of the Russian Northern Front, 4 infantry and 2 cavalry divisions were sent to Volyn, Galicia and the Carpathians, while Evert transferred 20 infantry and 8 cavalry divisions to Brusilov. From the German armies operating against the troops of the Russian Northern Front, 6 infantry divisions and one cavalry division were sent to repel Brusilov's offensive. Kuropatkin also transferred 6 infantry and 1 cavalry divisions to the Southwestern Front. If we take into account that the Central Powers during the same time reinforced the troops of the army group of Prince Leopold and Hindenburg with three infantry divisions (including one Austro-Hungarian from Galicia), it turned out that the offensive of Brusilov's armies diverted more Russian formations than enemy formations from the front expected general offensive. True, the Central Powers was forced to throw into battle 4 strategic reserve divisions in the East, a division from the Balkan Front (Army Group of Field Marshal August von Mackensen), 7 German divisions from France, 6 Austro-Hungarian divisions from the Italian theatre of operations and 2 Turkish divisions from Bosphorus. But the weakening of the Quadruple Alliance forces in these theatres was of little consequence, except on the Italian front, where the Austro-Hungarian forces were driven back into South Tyrol and lost Gorizia.
