= Nikolai Stogov =

Russian and Soviet general (1873–1959)

Nikolai Nikolayevich Stogov
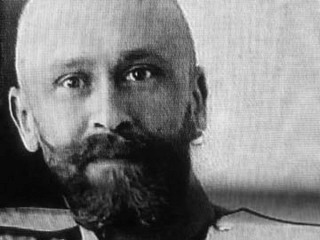
- Born: 10 September 1873
- Died: 7 December 1959 (aged 86) Sainte-Geneviève-des-Bois, Essonne, France
- Allegiance: Russian Empire; Russian SFSR (Russia) White Movement
- Branch: (Russian Empire) Imperial Russian Army (Russian Soviet Federative Socialist Republic) Red Army (Russia) White Army
- Rank: Lieutenant general
- Commands: Southwestern Front
- Conflicts: World War I Russian Civil War

Nikolai Nikolayevich Stogov (Russian: Николай Николаевич Стогов; 10 September 1873 – 7 December 1959) was a Russian general who fought in World War I and the Russian Civil War.

== Biography ==
He graduated from Nicholas Cadet Corps, Konstantinovskoe Artillery School and joined the Volinsky Life-Guards Regiment. In 1900, he graduated from General Staff Academy as "first-class", earning the right to accelerated promotion. In November 1900, he held the post of senior adjutant of the 17th Infantry Division, and in May 1901, he served as a superior officer for special assignments at the 6th Army Corps Headquarters; from September 1904 to March 1909, as a senior adjutant of the Warsaw Military District headquarters. In December 1908, he was promoted to the rank of colonel, and in May 1909, he was appointed head of the Office of Military History in the Division of General Quartermaster General Headquarters. Since 14 July 1910, the MDGs clerk.

=== First World War ===
At the start of the war in 1914, he was chief of staff of the 1st Finnish Rifle Brigade. In autumn 1914 he was appointed commander of the 3rd Finnish Rifle Regiment. On 15 April 1915, the General Quartermaster headquarters of the 8th Army of Brusylov was appointed. On 25 September 1916 he was appointed chief of staff of the 8th Army. He was the closest assistant to Generals Aleksei Brusilov and Alexey Kaledin. After the February Revolution, he was rapidly promoted. On 2 April 1917 he became commander of the 16th Army Corps and was promoted to lieutenant general on 29 April 1917. After the statement by General Lavr Kornilov, on 10 September 1917, he replaced General Sergey Markov as Chief of staff of the armies of the Southwestern Front. After the October Revolution, he served as commander-in-chief of the front armies for some time.

=== Russian Civil War ===
In January 1918, Stogov joined the Red Army. From 8 May to 2 August 1918, he was chief of Red Army Headquarters (one of two it had) – Vserosglavshtab. In October-November 1918, Stogov was arrested by Cheka. From 25 November 1918 he worked in the Central Archive system. From 1 February 1919 he was an assistant manager in the 1st Moscow Branch of the 3rd (military) section of the Central Archive. Cooperated with the Anti-Bolshevik underground Organization National Centre, participated in the clandestine headquarters of the anti-government Volunteer Army of the Moscow district; since April 1919, commander-in-chief of the Volunteer Army of the Moscow District. In April 1919, again arrested by Cheka. He was held in Butyrskaya prison and Andronikov Monastery. In autumn 1919 he escaped from detention. He fled to Poland, where he came to the White Movement in the south of Russia. In the White Movement, he served as the chief of staff of the Kuban Army of VSUR to General Andrei Shkuro from January to February 1920. Since May 1920, the commander of Sevastopol in the Russian army Pyotr Wrangel; at the same time, the commander of the rear area troops.

=== In exile ===
After the evacuation, he lived in Zemun (Yugoslavia) for several years, from 1924 moved to Paris, where he worked at the factory. Since 1928, deputy chief, and since 6 July 1930, chief of the Military Chancellery of Russian All-Military Union (until 1934). Since 1948 vice-chairman of the Committee of the Guards Association, collaborated in the Hour magazine. He died in the Russian retirement house in Sainte-Geneviève-des-Bois, Essonne.

== Awards ==
- Order of Saint Stanislaus (House of Romanov), 3rd class, 1904
- Order of Saint Stanislaus, 2nd class, 1906
- Order of Saint Vladimir, 4th class (19 July 1910)
- Gold Sword for Bravery (10 June 1915)
- Order of Saint George, 4th degree (14 June 1915)
- Order of Saint Stanislaus, 1st class (10 April 1916)
- Order of Saint Anna, 1st class (9 August 1916)

Preceded by Nikolai Volodchenko	Commander of the Southwestern Front; November – December 1917	Succeeded by Vladimir Yegoryev
Preceded by office created	Chiefs of the All-Russian Main Staff of the Revolutionary Military Council of the Republic; May 1918 – August 1919	Succeeded by Alexander Andreyevich Svechin
