= Battle of Berestechko (1916) =

Battle on Eastern front of World War I

- Part of the Second Brusilov offensive during Eastern Front
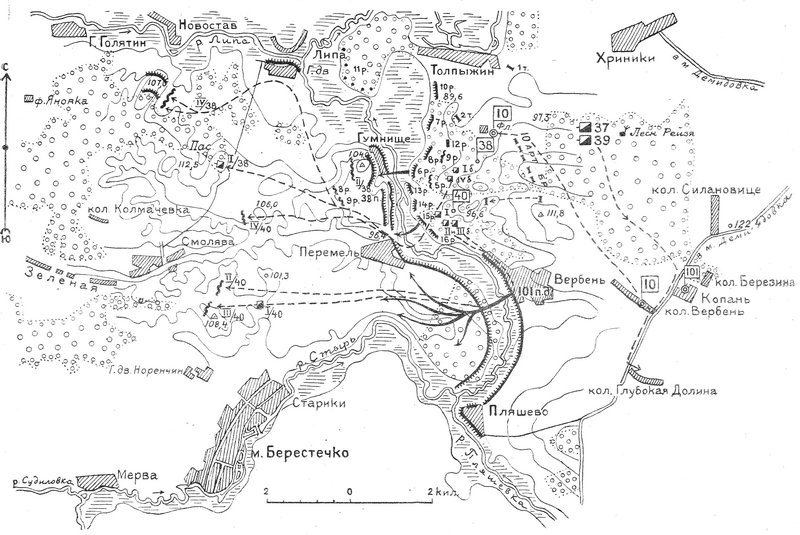
- Descriptions of the fighting in the Berestechko area, compiled in the USSR, 1926
Date	7–8 July 1916
Location	Berestechko and Styr, Russian Empire (Present-day Ukraine)
Result	Russian victory

Belligerents
Russian Empire	Austria-Hungary; German Empire

Commanders and leaders
Vladislav Klembovsky	Paul Puhallo von Brlog

Strength
200,000	85,000

Casualties and losses
30,000 casualties	Total casualties unknown; 27,000 captured

The Battle of Berestechko was a Russian offensive on Berestechko and the districts along the Styr river during the Brusilov offensive as part of World War I. It started on the 7th of July 1916, and ended the next day. Russian forces emerged victorious in the battle, managing to cross the river, seize the city, and capture numerous prisoners of war despite sustaining significant casualties within the Russian 11th Army.

200,000 Russian soldiers fought 85,000 soldiers of the armies of the Central Powers, made up of majority Austrian forces; containing one non Austrian division. The Russians suffered 30,000 casualties, and took 27,000 prisoners; the Central Powers casualty figures are unknown.
