= 5th Army Corps (Russian Empire) =

- Active: 1877—1918
- Country: Russian Empire; Russian Republic
- Branch: (Russian Empire) Imperial Russian Army
- Size: ~20,000
- HQ: Warsaw (until 1909), Voronezh (after 1909)
- Engagements: Russo-Turkish War (1877–78); World War I; Battle of Łódź (1914); Battle of the Vistula River

The 5th Army Corps was an Army corps in the Imperial Russian Army.

== Composition ==
- 7th Infantry Division
- 10th Infantry Division

== Part of ==
- 5th Army: 1914–1915
- 12th Army: 1915
- 10th Army: 1915
- 2nd Army: 1915–1916
- 11th Army: 1916
- 8th Army: 1916
- 11th Army: 1917

== Commanders ==
- 1905: Nikolai Vonlyarlyarsky
- 1909: Nikolai Schutlewort
- 1911-1913: Alexander Litvinov
- 1914-1917: Pyotr Baluyev
