= Alexander Litvinov =

Imperial Russian Army general (1853–1932)

Alexander Ivanovich Litvinov
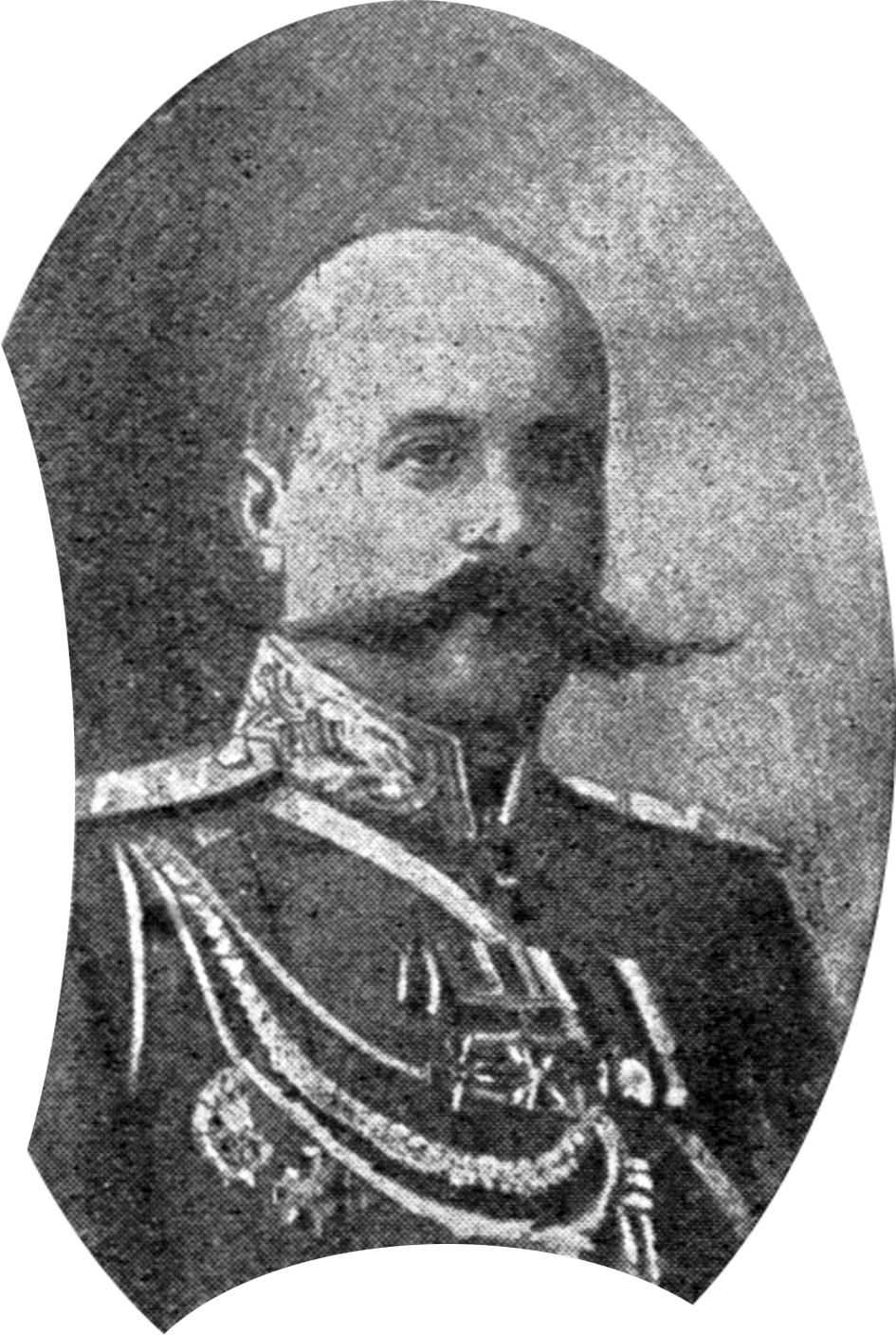
- Born: 22 August 1853
- Died: 1932
- Allegiance: Russian Empire; Russian SFSR
- Branch: (Russian Empire) Imperial Russian Army (Russian Soviet Federative Socialist Republic) Red Army
- Service years: 1870–1917; 1918–?
- Rank: General of the Cavalry
- Commands: 1st Infantry Division; 25th Army Corps; 29th Army Corps
- Conflicts: Russo-Turkish War; World War I

Alexander Ivanovich Litvinov (Russian: Александр Иванович Литвинов; 22 August 1853 – 1932) was a general in the Imperial Russian Army.

== Biography ==
Litvinov was educated in the 1st Moscow military school and entered military service on 5 August 1870. He graduated from the 3rd Military Alexandrovskoye and Mikhaylovskoye Artillery School in 1873. He was appointed a lieutenant (10 August 1873) in the 1st Horse-Artillery Brigade. He then served in the 2nd Cavalry Artillery team.

He fought in the Russian-Turkish War of 1877–1878, attaining the rank of captain on 18 December 1880. In 1882 he graduated from the Academy of General Staff of the Mykolayiv. He then went to the Vilensky Military District. On 24 November 1882, he was appointed senior staff adjutant to the 4th Cavalry Division, attaining the rank of colonel on 24 March 1885. On 29 September 1886, he was appointed the chief of staff of the Vilno Military District. On 19 April 1890, he became chief of staff of the 2nd Cavalry Division. Then on 12 June 1896, he became commander of the 4th Pskov Dragoon Regiment. He attained the rank of major-general on 23 June 1899, and was given a special assignment with the Don Cossacks. On 20 September 1900, he was put in command of the Warsaw Military District. On 9 November 1906, he was once again made chief of staff of the Vilno Military District. He reached the rank of lieutenant-general on 6 December 1905, and was appointed head of the 1st Cavalry Division on 9 October 1906. On 9 March 1911, he became commander of the 5th Army Corps and General of Cavalry on 6 December 1911.

At the head of the 7th and 10th Infantry Division, he entered the First World War in the 5th Army. However, at a meeting of commanders held at Siedlce on 17 November 1914, he was appointed commander of the 1st Army, replacing General Paul von Rennenkampf.

Litvinov's First Army participated in the Lake Naroch offensive.

After the February Revolution, he was dismissed from the service with uniform and pension. From 1918 he served in the Red Army.

== Awards ==
- Order of St. Stanislaus, 3rd Class, with Swords and Bow, 1879; 2nd Class, 1888; 1st Class, 1904
- Order of St. Anna, 3rd Class, 1883; 2nd Class, 1894; 1st Class, 1908
- Order of St. Vladimir, 4th Class, 1896; 3rd Class, 1902, 2nd Class with Swords, 29 March 1915
- Order of St. George, 4th Class, 25 September 1914
- Order of the White Eagle, with Swords, 6 December 1915
