= Khitrovo =

Khitrovo may refer to:

- Bogdan Khitrovo (died 1680), Russian boyar
- Nikolai Khitrovo (1779–1826), Russian general
- the Khitrovo Gospels, an illuminated manuscript
