= Southwestern Front (Russian Empire) =

Army group of the Imperial Russian Army during World War I

Southwestern Front Юго-Западный фронт
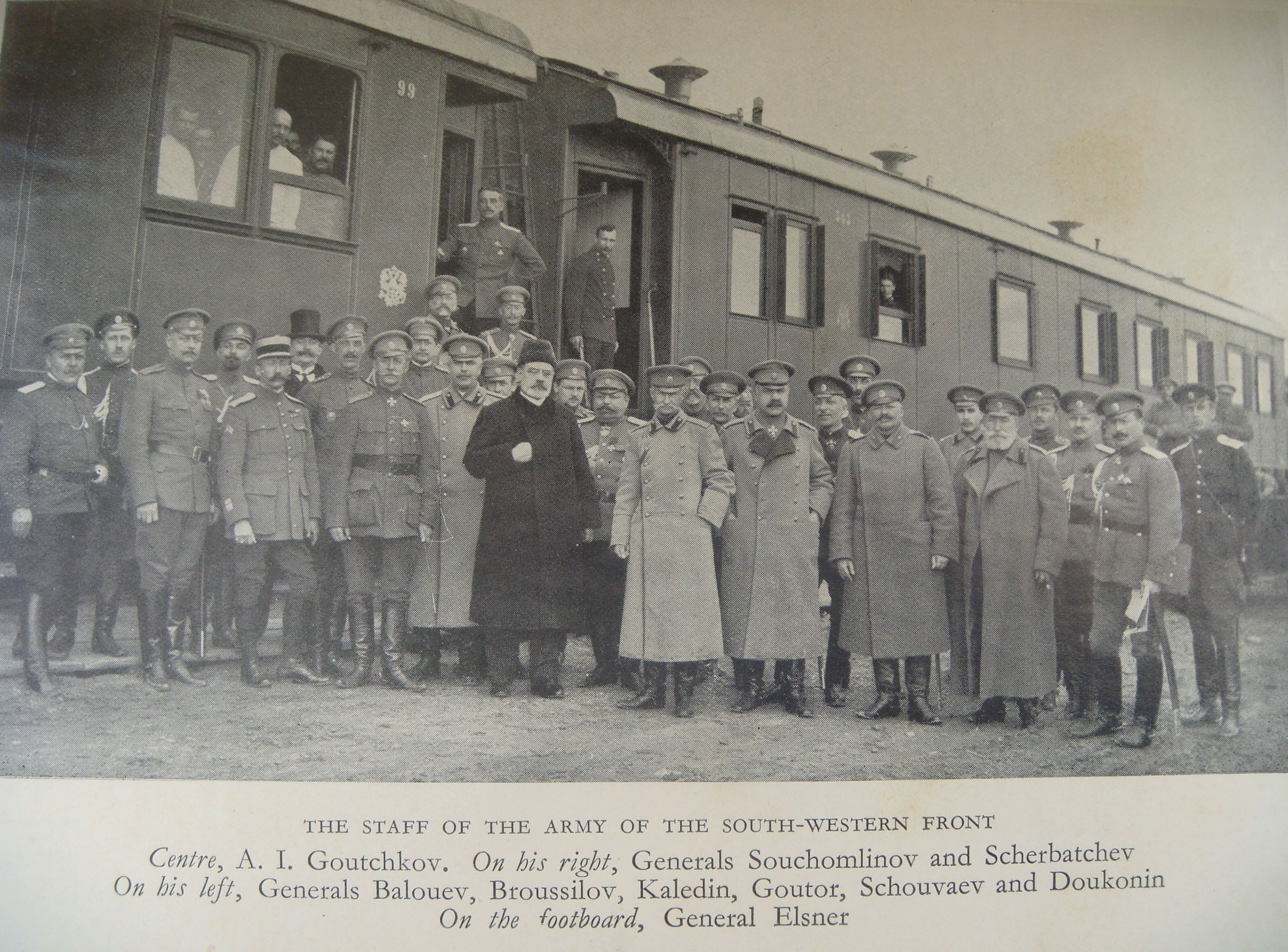
- The headquarters staff of the Southwestern Front, 1917
- Active: 1914–1918
- Country: Russian Empire; Ukrainian People's Republic
- Branch: Russian Imperial Army
- Role: Army group
- Size: ~2,000,000
- Engagements: World War I: Battle of Galicia; Brusilov Offensive

Commanders
- Notable commanders: Nikolai Ivanov; Alexei Brusilov; Lavr Kornilov

The Southwestern Front (Russian: Юго-Западный фронт) was an army group (Note: A "front" is the Russian equivalent of an army group, not to be confused with a geographic theater of operations.) of the Imperial Russian Army during World War I as part of the Eastern Front war theater.

During the conflict it was responsible for managing operations along a front line that stretched 615 kilometers across Ukraine, starting from what is now southern Belarus to northern Romania. To its left side (south), there was located Romanian Front which was a joint formation of the Russian Empire and the Kingdom of Romania. To its right side (north), there was located Northwestern Front which in 1915 split and Western Front was one that covered right flank of the Southwestern Front. The front was facing primarily against Austro-Hungarian Army and in few operations against Imperial German Army.

In 1917 the headquarters of the Front was located in Berdychiv and later moved west to Rivne.

It was established in August 1914 based on units of the Kiev Military District and the Odessa Military District and lasted throughout the war until the unrest caused by the Russian Revolution, at which point it was demobilized along with the rest of the Russian Army in early 1918. In total some two million troops had been under its command.

== Operations ==
- Battle of Galicia (23 August – 11 September 1914) → Russian occupation of Eastern Galicia
- Siege of Przemyśl (16 September 1914 – 22 March 1915)
- Battle of the Vistula River (29 September – 31 October 1914)
- Battle of Krzywopłoty (17 – 18 November 1914)
- Battle of Limanowa (1 – 13 December 1914)
- Battle of Łowczówek (22 – 25 December 1914)
- Carpathian Front (7 January – 20 April 1915)
- Gorlice–Tarnów offensive (2 May – 13 July 1915)
- Great Retreat (13 July – 19 September 1915)
- Rovno offensive (27 August – 15 October 1915)
- Brusilov offensive (4 June – 20 September 1916)
- Kerensky offensive (1 – 19 July 1917)
- Battle of Krechowce (24 July 1917)

- Operation Faustschlag (18 February – 3 March 1918) → Treaty of Brest-Litovsk
- Battle of Bakhmach (8 – 13 March 1918)
- Crimea Operation (13 – 25 April 1918)

== Key events ==
- Arrest of Generals in Berdychiv (29 August – 27 September 1917)
- Kornilov affair (10 – 13 September 1917) → Bolshevik coup-d'etat
- Assassination of Nikolay Dukhonin in Mogilev
- Kerensky–Krasnov uprising
- Ukrainian–Soviet War (8 November 1917 – 17 November 1921)

== Armies deployed on the Southwestern Front ==
The following field armies were part of the Southwestern Front.

- 3rd Army (July 1914 – June 1915 and June 1916 – July 1916)
  - 19.07.1914 – 03.09.1914 — General of Infantry Nikolai Ruzsky
  - 03.09.1914 – 20.05.1915 — General of Infantry Radko Dimitriev
  - 03.06.1915 – 03.08.1917 — General of Infantry Leonid Lesh
- 5th Army (July 1914 – September 1914)
  - General of Cavalry Pavel Plehve
- 8th Army (July 1914 – August 1917)
  - 28.07.1914 – 17.03.1916 — General of Cavalry Aleksei Brusilov
  - 23.03.1916 – 29.04.1917 — General of Cavalry Alexey Kaledin
  - 29.04.1917 – 10.07.1917 — General of Infantry Lavr Kornilov
  - 11.07.1917 – 25.07.1917 — Lieutenant-General Vladimir Cheremisov
  - 30.07.1917 – 17.10.1917 — Lieutenant-General Michai Sokownin
- 4th Army (August 1914 – June 1915)
  - General of Infantry Alexei Evert
- 9th Army (August 1914 – December 1916 )
  - General of Infantry Platon Lechitsky
- 7th Army (October 1914 – early 1918)
  - 19 July 1914 – 19 October 1915 — General of Artillery Vladimir Nikolayevich Nikitin
  - 19 October 1915 – 11 April 1917 — General of Infantry Dmitry Shcherbachev
  - 13 April 1917 – 20 June 1917 — Lieutenant-General Leonid Bielkowicz
  - 26 June 1917 – 9 September 1917 — Lieutenant-General Vladimir Selivachyov
  - 9 September 1917 – 3 December 1917 — Lieutenant-General Januariusz Cichowicz
- 11th Army (October 1914 – early 1918), created during the Siege of Przemyśl as "Siege Army"
  - 21.10.1914 – 05.04.1915 — General of Infantry Andrey Selivanov
  - 05.04.1915 – 19.10.1915 — General of Infantry Dmitry Shcherbachev
  - 19.10. 1915 – 25.10.1916 — General of Infantry Vladimir Viktorovich Sakharov
  - 25.10.1916 – 20.12.1916 — General of Infantry Vladislav Klembovsky
  - 20.12.1916 – 05.04.1917 — General of Infantry Dimitri Bałanin
  - 15.04.1917 – 21.05.1917 — Lieutenant-General Aleksei Gutor
  - 25.05.1917 – 04.06.1917 — General of Infantry Ivan Fiedotov
  - 04.06.1917 – 09.07.1917 — General of Cavalry Ivan Erdélyi
  - 29.04.1917 – 09.09.1917 — General of Infantry Pyotr Baluyev
  - 19.07.1917 – 29.08.1917 — Lieutenant-General Fiodor Rerberg
  - 09.09.1917 – 01.12.1917 — Lieutenant-General Mikhail Promtov
- Special Army (September 1916 – November 1916 and July 1917 – early 1918)
  - 14.08.1916 – 10.11.1916 - General of Cavalry Vasily Gurko
  - 10.11.1916 – 17.02.1917 - General of Infantry Pyotr Baluyev
  - 17.02.1917 – 31.03.1917 - General of Cavalry Vasily Gurko
  - 02.04.1917 – 09.07.1917 - General of Infantry Pyotr Baluyev
  - 12.07.1917 – 29.08.1917 - General of Cavalry Ivan Erdélyi
  - 29.08.1917 – 14.09.1917 - Acting Major General Vasily Sarychev
  - 14.09.1917 – 20.11.1917 - General of Infantry Stepan Stelnitsky
  - 11.1917 - Acting Colonel Alexander Ilyich Yegorov
  - 20.11.1917 – 13.12.1917 - Lieutenant General Theodore Rerberg
  - 13.12.1917 – 19.12.1917 - Lieutenant General Alex Kushakevich
  - 12.19.1917 – 03.1918 - Colonel Vladimir Yegoryev
- 1st Army (July 1917 – September 1917)
  - Lieutenant General Gleb Vannovsky
- Separate Danube Army
- Separate Czechoslovak Corps

== Command ==
=== Commander of the armies of the Southwestern Front ===
The commanders of the Southwestern Front were as follows.

Appointed	Commander	Dismissed
19.07.1914	General of Infantry Nikolai Ivanov	17.03.1916
17.03.1916	General of Cavalry Aleksei Brusilov	21.05.1917
22.05.1917	Lieutenant General Aleksei Gutor	10.07.1917
10.07.1917	General of Infantry Lavr Kornilov	18.07.1917
24.07.1917	Lieutenant General Peter Baluev	31.07.1917
02.08.1917	Lieutenant General Anton Ivanovich Denikin	29.08.1917
29.08.1917	Lieutenant General Fyodor Ogorodnikov	09.09.1917
09.09.1917	Lieutenant General Nikolai Volodchenko	24.11.1917
11.1917	Lieutenant General Nikolai Stogov	12.1917
01.1918	Lieutenant General Vladimir Yegoryev	02.1918

=== Bolshevik leaders ===
Appointed	Commander	Dismissed
12.1917	Praporshchik Alexander Myasnikov	01.1918
01.1918	Vasily Kikvidze	02.1918

=== Chiefs of Staff ===
Appointed	Commander	Dismissed
19.07.1914	Lieutenant General Mikhail Alekseyev	17.03.1915
23.03.1915	Lieutenant General Vladimir Dragomirov	08.05.1915
08.05.1915	General of Infantry Sergei Savvich	13.12.1915
13.12.1915	General of Infantry Vladislav Klembovsky	23.10.1916
23.10.1916	Lieutenant General Semyon Sukhomlin	29.05.1917
29.05.1917	Major General Nikolay Dukhonin	04.08.1917
04.08.1917	Lieutenant General Sergey Markov	29.08.1917
10.09.1917	Lieutenant General Nikolai Stogov	24.11.1917

== See also ==
- List of Imperial Russian Army formations and units
- South-Western Front electoral district (Russian Constituent Assembly election, 1917)
