= Rovno offensive =

1915 Austria-Hungary offensive on the Eastern Front of World War I

Rovno Offensive
- Part of the Eastern Front of World War I
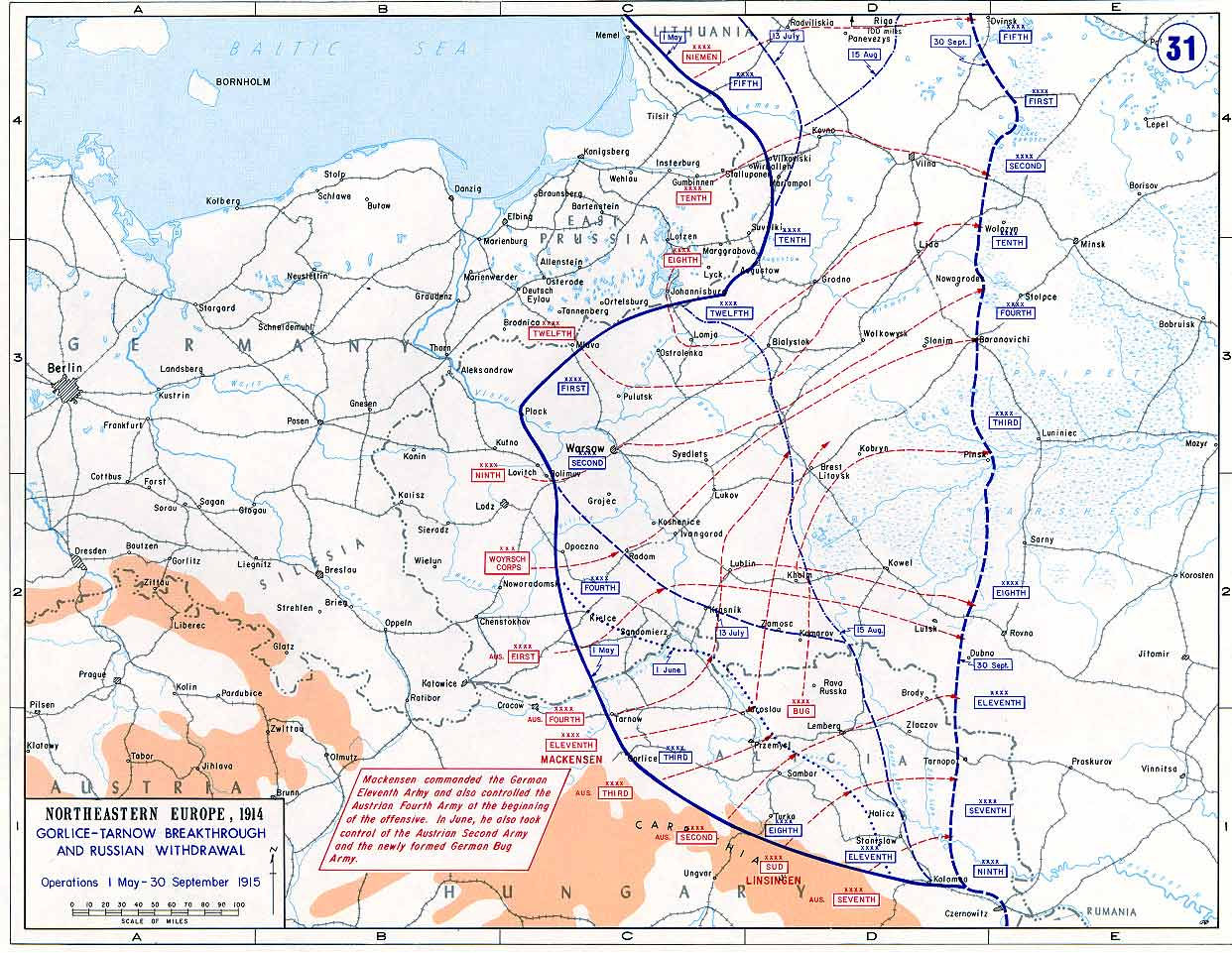
- Great Retreat and Rovno offensive
| Date | 27 August – 15 October 1915 |
| Location | Rovno (Western Ukraine) |
| Result | Russian victory |

Belligerents
| Austria-Hungary; German Empire | Russian Empire |

Commanders and leaders
| (Austria-Hungary) Franz Conrad von Hötzendorf | Nikolai Ivanov; Platon Lechitsky; Alexei Brusilov; Vladimir Sakharov |

Units involved
| (Austria-Hungary) 1st Army (Austria-Hungary) 2nd Army (Austria-Hungary) 4th Army (Austria-Hungary) 7th Army | 8th Army; 9th Army; 11th Army |

Strength
| On 28 August 1915; Total: 1,120,000 men 2,066 guns 1,425 machine guns | On 28 August 1915; Total: >1,000,000 men 1,883 guns 1,471 machine guns |

Casualties and losses
| Total: 214,965 men 18,199 KIA; 74,053 WIA; 122,713 MIA | Total: 289,695 men 41,205 KIA; 179,394 WIA; 69,096 MIA |

The Rovno offensive — the operation of the Austro-Hungarian Northern armies against the armies of the Russian Southwestern Front — the so-called campaign on Rovno, or Lutsk-Rovno offensive operation. The purpose of the offensive was the liberation of Eastern Galicia, but by the end of the operation, a small part of Eastern Galicia was still held by the Russian Imperial Army.

== Background ==
At the end of August 1915, the Austro-Hungarian command plans a major offensive on Rovno by the forces of the 1st and 4th Armies. At the same time, the 2nd, 7th and German Southern Armies were to finally oust the Russian troops from the borders of Austria-Hungary and, if possible, occupy Podolia. The idea of the operation on August 14 was outlined by the Chief of the General Staff of Austria-Hungary, Infantry General Franz Conrad von Hötzendorf to his German colleague, Infantry General Erich von Falkenhayn. Success was supposed to bring a breakthrough at the junction of the 3rd Army of the NorthWestern Front and the 8th Army of the SouthWestern Front and coverage of the left flank of the 8th Army with access to Rovno. The Russian 11th Army was dealt a frontal attack by the 2nd and Southern armies. The Austro-Hungarian 7th Army, if possible, drove the Russian 9th Army from the Dniester River and occupied the city of Kamianets-Podilskyi. The Central Powers managed to concentrate numerically superior forces, especially on the right flank of the Russian 8th Army. At the same time, the entire Austro-Hungarian 4th Army was in reserve for the development of success. But the command of the armies of the Russian Southwestern Front, using the stable position of the 9th Army, concentrated the reserve in two army corps to fend off a possible breakthrough and cover the 8th Army.

== Battle ==
After the occupation of Kovel by the Austro-Hungarian 1st Army on August 25, Archduke Josef Ferdinand deployed the XIV Corps around the right flank of the Russian 8th Army, sent the IX and X corps along the Lutsk highway. A significant superiority in manpower was countered by marshy terrain cut by rivers and destroyed roads in the rear. Only the highway from Rava-Ruska and Lvov (Lemberg) worked.

On August 26-27, the Austro-Hungarian 1st Army reached the Stokhid River. The V Corps of the 2nd Army attacked the 6th Army Corps of the Russian 11th Army and crossed the Zolota Lypa River. The commander-in-chief of the armies of the Southwestern Front, Nikolai Ivanov, to parry the detour, handed over to Aleksei Brusilov his reserve - the 39th Army Corps with the task of inflicting a counter strike on the Austro-Hungarians northwest of Lutsk. To reduce the front, it was ordered on the night of August 8 to begin the withdrawal of the troops of the 8th and 11th Armies.

On August 28-30, the Austro-Hungarian troops continued their offensive and crossed the Styr River in several places. The XIV Corps bypassed Lutsk from the east, the counterattacks of the Russian 39th Army Corps were repelled. Ivanov allowed Brusilov to begin a gradual withdrawal of the 8th Army and asked the neighboring 3rd Army not to withdraw and to support the right flank of the front with cavalry. The dispatch of the 30th Army Corps to the Northwestern Front was canceled; it was also sent to the 8th Army. These maneuvers were facilitated by the presence of a railway in the rear.

But on August 31, the Austro-Hungarian XIV Corps struck a new blow and captured Lutsk. The 8th Army retreated across the Styr River. The reason for the failure was that in the midst of the attack, the 39th Army Corps ran out of cartridges for the Japanese rifles with which it was armed. On the site of the 11th Army, a blow was struck at Zolochiv, but here the fighting took on a stubborn character; a counterattack by the Russian 22nd and 18th Army Corps managed to return some of the positions and capture 4,689 prisoners from the Southern Army, which was driven back across the Studzyanka River.

On August 31, von Hötzendorf brought to the army commanders the goal of further actions: not only to clear Eastern Galicia from Russian troops, but also to deliver a decisive blow, for which the 2nd Army, avoiding protracted battles, bypass the Ikva River from the south through Kremenets, 1- The 1st Army will also capture Dubno bypass, the 4th Army will capture Rovno as soon as possible, where Russian reinforcements are arriving. After regrouping, the Austro-Hungarian troops continued their offensive, which on September 3-4 ran into stubborn resistance from the Russian 8th and 11th Armies.

On the right flank of the 8th Army, the Russian 12th and 39th Army Corps went on the offensive, 4,453 prisoners and 15 machine guns were captured. But then the Austro-Hungarians managed to cover the attackers from the flanks and push back. Moved forward to cover the gap between the retreating flanks of the 8th and 3rd Armies, the 4th Cavalry Corps, reinforced by the 77th and 83rd Infantry Divisions, on September 5, pincered the marching column of the Austro-Hungarian 7th Cavalry Division and stopped advancing Austro-Hungarian cavalry, being deep behind enemy lines. To protect communications against the Russian cavalry, the Austro-Hungarian 1st Cavalry Division and the 1st Brigade of the Polish Legion were sent. In the sectors of the 11th and 9th Armies, the Austro-Hungarians launched several attacks on the bridgeheads near Tarnopol, but were unsuccessful.

On September 6-7, the Austro-Hungarian 1st Army broke through the positions of the 8th Army, capturing 6,000 prisoners and 6 machine guns; Brusilov withdrew the troops. The Russian 11th Army withdrew the 6th and 18th Army Corps, but attacked the 22nd Army Corps, assisting the 9th Army, which went on the offensive. The Russian 18th Army Corps also launched a counterattack near Tarnopol on 7 September. 8,200 prisoners were taken, 21 machine guns and 14 guns. The attempt of the Austro-Hungarians to counterattack was at first successful: 3,700 prisoners and 7 machine guns were captured, but the lack of reserves forced the Austro-Hungarians to return to their original positions. The Russian 2nd Cavalry and 11th Army Corps pushed the enemy back across the Seret River and captured 3,355 prisoners, 10 machine guns, and 3 guns.

On September 8, the X Corps of the 4th Austro-Hungarian Army attacked Klevan and Tsuman, but due to rains, the floodplain of the Putilovka River turned into a swamp, and progress was slow. On September 9, the 1st Army occupied the city of Dubno, abandoned by the Russians. Brusilov withdrew the troops of the 8th Army to the Stubel River. The Russian 11th and 9th Armies these days continued their attacks on the junction of the Southern and 7th Armies and at Tarnopol. During the ongoing stubborn fighting on September 10, the Austro-Hungarians managed to push back the 6th and 7th Army Corps and repel the attacks of the Russian 11th Army corps at Khmelivka, but the Russian 33rd Army Corps pushed back the Austro-Hungarians, capturing another 4,716 prisoners. Von Hötzendorf was forced to cancel the sending of the VI Corps to the Serbian front and assign him to the reserve.

Von Hötzendorf strengthened the 2nd Army at the expense of the 1st, which went on the defensive, like the 7th and Southern Armies, allocated the cavalry of the left flank to fight the 4th Cavalry Corps of the Russian 3rd Army north and east Kovel, and ordered the attack on Rovno only by the forces of the 4th Army. But on September 11-12, echelons of the Russian 30th Army Corps arrived in Rovno, reinforcing the right flank of the 8th Army. On the site of the 11th Army, its 7th and 6th Army Corps were able to stop the advance of the strike group of the army of Eduard von Böhm-Ermolli, and the 18th and 22nd Army Corps launched a counterattack at the junction of the Austro-Hungarian 2nd and German Southern Armies, forcing the Austro-Hungarians to retreat across the Strypa River with the loss of 91 officers and 4,644 soldiers and 9 machine guns as prisoners. By September 13, the Austro-Hungarian 2nd Army was able to stabilise the situation, but the Southern Army, which was also attacked by Lechitsky's troops, retreated to the right bank of the Vosushka River. The left flank of the Austro-Hungarian 7th Army was also assigned to the crossings on the Strypa River.

On September 13, the Russian armies of the Southwestern Front launched a general offensive. The 9th Army pushed the enemy back, the 11th Army with its left wing continued to push the German Southern Army, and with its right wing defeated the 5th Austro-Hungarian Corps and drove back the Austro-Hungarian 2nd Army. On September 14, the Russian 11th Army Corps crossed the Strypa River and forced the Austro-Hungarians to clear the bridgeheads on the left bank of the river. The development of success was prevented by the retreat of the Russian corps of the 3rd and 4th Armies across the Yaselda and Zelvyanka rivers in front of the advancing German army group of Prince Leopold of Bavaria. On September 15-16, in stubborn battles, the Austro-Hungarian positions on the Stubel River were broken through by the shock group of the 8th Army. On September 17, the front of the Austro-Hungarian 4th Army on the Putilovka River was broken through, and Archduke Joseph Ferdinand on the night of September 18 withdrew the army to new lines. However, in the sector of the Russian 11th and 9th Armies, the Central Powers managed to stop the offensive. On September 16-17, the 2nd and Southern Armies ousted the Russian troops from the western bank of the Strypa River with counterattacks. By September 18, active hostilities on the Dniester and Strypa ended.

On September 18-19, the Russian 8th Army attacked Lutsk, but was repulsed; ended in failure the attempt of the Russian 17th Army Corps to force the Ikva River. Brusilov decided to regroup to develop the offensive. P. Makhrov, head of the operational department of the headquarters of the 8th Army, called the days of September 19-22 "gifted to the enemy." The development of the offensive of the 8th Army towards Lutsk was also affected by the situation in the neighboring Russian 3rd Army. On September 16, German troops occupied Slonim and Pinsk and reached the middle reaches of the Shchara River. At the request of the Austro-Hungarian Army High Command, Erich von Falkenhayn transferred the German XXIV Reserve Corps to the ally. On the basis of the German Army of the Bug, on September 20, an army group of infantry general A. von Linzingen was formed, which included the Austro-Hungarian 4th Army. The Austro-Hungarian 1st and 2nd Armies made up the army group of the cavalry general Eduard von Böhm-Ermolli.

The 12th, 30th and 39th Army Corps of the 8th Army resumed attacks on the Styr River on September 23, broke through the positions of the Austro-Hungarians, surrounded and partially captured the 24th Infantry Division. In the morning, the Russian 4th Rifle Division captured Lutsk. During the offensive, up to 12,000 Austro-Hungarian prisoners were captured, the commander and banner of the Austrian 8th Infantry Regiment. But the centre and left flank of the 8th Army could not move forward.

== Outcome ==
The Rovno offensive did not lead to the achievement of the goal set by the Austro-Hungarian Army High Command. A small part of Eastern Galicia was still occupied by Russian troops, The Dual Monarchy managed to capture Lutsk and part of Volhynia and Polesia, but the Russian troops turned the tide of the operation, inflicted a strong counterattack on the Austro-Hungarians and heavy losses. Russian troops, not having superiority in strength in this operation, at the same time captured a large number of Austro-Hungarian prisoners - 1,294 officers and 71,625 soldiers, 212 machine guns, 37 guns. It was possible to keep Lutsk and the line of the Styr and Kormin Rivers only with the help of German troops. The result of stubborn and bloody battles in the autumn of 1915 in Galicia and Volhynia, as well as in Belarus and the Baltic states, was the transition of the forces of the Central Powers to strategic defense.

Decisive actions of the Russian command during the entire campaign in favour of the Entente, revealed the weakness of the Austro-Hungarian troops, which then allowed another offensive to be launched in Galicia.

== Sources ==
- Олейников, Алексей (2016). Россия-щит Антанты. С предисловием Николая Старикова [Russia - Shield of the Entente. With a preface by Nikolai Starikov] (in Russian). St. Petersburg: Питер. ISBN 978-5-496-01795-4.
- Oleynikov, Alexei (2024). Великое отступление и стабилизация восточного фронта [The Great Retreat and stabilization of the Eastern Front] (in Russian). Moscow: Вече. ISBN 978-5-4484-4482-1.
