= Special Army =

World War I Russian field army

The Russian Special Army was a World War I Russian field army that fought on the Eastern Front.

Field management was established in August 1916. The Army was named Special because it was thought that the name 13th Army would bring bad luck.

== Composition ==
At the end of 1917 the army consisted of:

- 31st Army Corps
- 39th Army Corps
- 44th Army Corps
- XLVI Corps
- I Turkestan Army Corps
- IV Cavalry Corps
- VII Cavalry Corps

== Deployment ==
- Western Front (August–September 1916)
- Southwestern Front (September–November 1916)
- Western Front (November 1916 – July 1917)
- Southwestern Front (July 1917 – early 1918)

== Commanders ==
The commanders of the Army were:

- 14.08.1916 – 10.11.1916 - General of Cavalry Vasily Gurko
- 10.11.1916 – 17.02.1917 - General of Infantry Pyotr Baluyev
- 17.02.1917 – 31.03.1917 - General of Cavalry Vasily Gurko
- 02.04.1917 – 09.07.1917 - General of Infantry Pyotr Baluyev
- 12.07.1917 – 29.08.1917 - General of Cavalry Ivan Erdélyi
- 29.08.1917 – 14.09.1917 - Acting Major General Vasily Sarychev
- 14.09.1917 – 20.11.1917 - General of Infantry Stepan Stelnitsky
- 11.1917 - Acting Colonel Alexander Ilyich Yegorov
- 20.11.1917 – 13.12.1917 - Lieutenant General Theodore Rerberg
- 13.12.1917 – 19.12.1917 - Lieutenant General Alex Kushakevich
- 12.19.1917 – 03.1918 - Colonel Vladimir Yegoryev

== See also ==
- List of Russian armies in World War I
