= Greek Volunteer Legion =

Military unit that fought for Russia in 1854–1856

Greek Legion
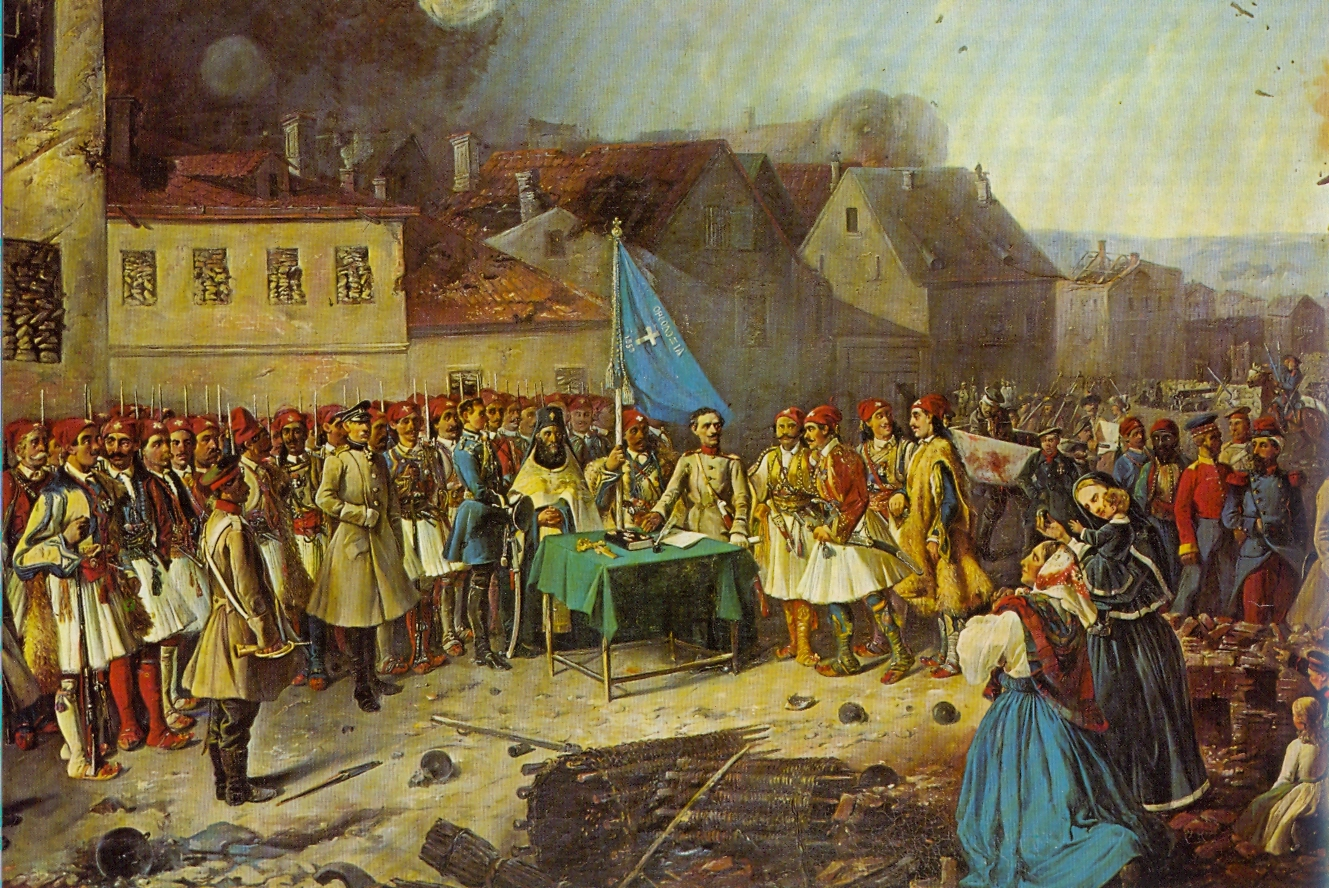
- The Greek Legion in Sevastopol, painting at the Benaki Museum, Athens
- Active: 1854–1856
- Country: Russia
- Type: Irregular infantry
- Size: 1,079 (July 1854); 672 (September 1854); 700 (February 1855); 823 (early March 1855); 743 (late March 1855)
- Engagements: Crimean War; Danube Front; Battle of Eupatoria; Siege of Sevastopol

The Greek Volunteer Legion (Greek: Ελληνική Λεγεώνα Εθελοντών) was a volunteer military corps formed by Greeks and other Balkan Christians that fought for the Russian Empire during the Crimean War. It was formed in the Danubian Principalities in March 1854, and some elements participated in the final engagements of the Danube theatre, before the Russian troops abandoned the Principalities. From there the Legion was sent to the Crimea, where it fought in the Siege of Sevastopol. In 1855, the Legion received the title Greek Legion of Emperor Nicholas I (Russian: Греческий легион императора Николая I). After the end of the siege, the bulk of the Legion was discharged, and the remainder of the unit was disbanded after the war's end in March 1856. Most of the volunteers returned to their homelands, although some settled in Russia.

== Background ==
The outbreak of the Crimean War caused much enthusiasm among the Christian populations living under the Ottoman Empire. In the young Kingdom of Greece, it was considered as an opportunity for realizing the irredentist aspirations of the Megali Idea, and the Greek government sponsored uprisings against Ottoman rule in Thessaly, Epirus, and Macedonia in early 1854. Badly organized and facing strong Ottoman forces, these uprisings were doomed to failure, particularly after Greece itself was forced to a strict neutrality in the conflict following the Anglo-French occupation of Piraeus.

== Formation of the Greek Legion ==
At the same time, volunteers from the Christian Balkan nations flocked to the Russian army that had entered the Danubian Principalities. This led the Russian commander, Prince Mikhail Dmitrievich Gorchakov, to authorize the creation of a volunteer corps under Lieutenant General Salas in December 1853. Initially a battalion of four companies, this corps comprised volunteers from the Danubian Principalities, as well as Greeks, Serbs, and Bulgarians. To avoid ethnic tensions, the volunteers of each nation were assigned to a different company. By 19 February 1854, the corps numbered 859 volunteers: 502 Bulgarians, 257 Greeks, and the rest Wallachians. They were billeted in villages around Brăila, Focșani, and Galați.

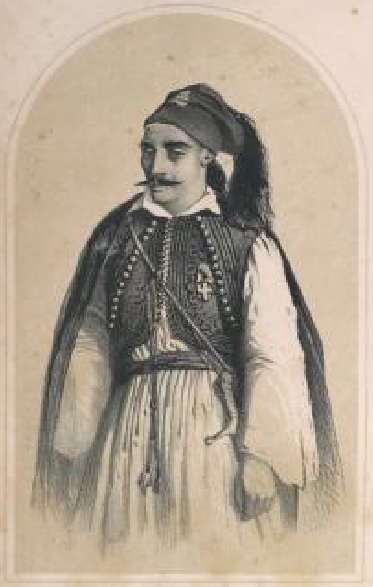
Sketch of Aristeidis Chrysovergis, one of the commanders of the Legion, and its main historian

By mid-March, the corps had grown to two battalions, one of which was Greek, and by May, Lieutenant General Fyodor Ivanovich Soymonov reported that the Greeks alone numbered 1097 men in ten companies, forming two battalions, with a third being created.

Command structure according to a list compiled in September 1854
Battalion №	Battalion commanders	Company №	Company commanders
1st Battalion	Konstantinos Zervas	1st	Nikolaos Karaiskos
1st Battalion	Konstantinos Zervas	2nd	Stavros Kostavelos
1st Battalion	Konstantinos Zervas	3rd	Stamatis Koromadis
1st Battalion	Konstantinos Zervas	4th	(no commander at the time)
2nd Battalion	Vasileios Balafas	1st	Panagis Kostolanos
2nd Battalion	Vasileios Balafas	2nd	Sterios Harisis
2nd Battalion	Vasileios Balafas	3rd	Antonios Gines
2nd Battalion	Vasileios Balafas	4th	Dimitrios Tandalidis

Moreover, it appears that there were two independent companies, under the priest Konstantinos Doukas (or "Papadoukas") and Aristeidis Chrysovergis, who was one of the chief recruiters of the corps, and later wrote a two-volume "History of the Greek Legion" (Ἱστορία τῆς ἑλληνικῆς λεγεῶνος, Odessa 1887–88). Russian personnel attached to the Greek corps was limited to one field officer, two instructor-captains, 16 sergeants, and a small drum and bugle detachment.

The Greeks chose a variant of the traditional dress, as used by the Mountain Guard of the Greek kingdom—similar to that now worn by the Evzones of the Greek Presidential Guard—as their uniform. Various designs were made for specific rank insignia as well as seals for the legion, with designs depicting a phoenix, or a double-headed eagle, or a cross over a crescent. While some of the Greeks enlisted bringing their own weapons, the rest were outfitted by the Russians.

Based on the surviving member lists—written in French or Russian—of three companies, slightly over a quarter of the volunteers came from the independent Greek kingdom, with the rest from all corners of the Greek world, including Ottoman territories—particularly the areas of Epirus, Thessaly, and Macedonia—the Ionian Islands (then a British protectorate), and the Danubian Principalities. Several of the men of the Greek legion appear also to have been of Serbian, Bosnian, Bulgarian, Montenegrin, or Moldavian origin. Notably, about half of the volunteers were sailors or merchants, and only about one in ten had a military background.

== Service history ==
=== Danube front ===
The Balkan volunteers were barely formed when the Russian army, under the threat of an Austrian attack, was forced to evacuate the Danubian Principalities in July 1854. According to the Russian historian E. Kovalesky, a small detachment of 25 local Greeks recruited by Chrysovergis is reported to have inflicted 78 casualties on a British landing detachment at Sulina in early June, before departing without losses. Chrysovergis, in his own account, places the incident against Cossacks fighting for the Ottomans. Some volunteers under Papadoukas also fought in the battle between Soymonov's troops and an Ottoman army at Giurgiu on 5–6 July. Finally, the 3rd company of the 2nd battalion (under Sterios Harisis) fought at the village of Cherna in October 1854, losing almost 100 of its men.

The retreat of the Russian forces north of the Danube reduced the usefulness of the various Balkan volunteers, and the costs of their upkeep led to suggestions of disbanding them and incorporating those who wished to stay on into regular Russian units. Indeed, most of the Moldavians and Wallachians left, and their two battalions were disbanded; but most of the two battalions of Bulgarians and Serbs stayed on, as did virtually all (1045 of 1079) of the Greeks.

Given the impossibility of the volunteers returning to their homelands under the conditions of war—especially as, unlike the Serbs and Bulgarians, most of the Greek volunteers had come by sea rather than overland—their inability to survive otherwise in a foreign and largely hostile country, and their potential usefulness against a feared Austrian attack, it was decided to retain the volunteers' services at reduced pay. Furthermore, the volunteer battalions were disbanded and their individual companies attached to Russian units. At least some of the Greeks were discharged, for by September only 672 men are recorded on the rolls; the battalions were broken up into six companies, which were then attached to the regiments of the 5th Infantry Division: Stamatis Karamadis' company to the 25th Smolensk Infantry Regiment; Nikolaos Karaiskos' to the 26th Mogilev Infantry Regiment; Dimitrios Tandalidis' to the 27th Vitebsk Infantry Regiment; and Sterios Harisis' and Aristeidis Chrysovergis' companies (later amalgamated to a single company under Chrysovergis) to the 28th Polotsk Infantry Regiment. Papadoukas' company was attached to the 5th Division's Rifles battalion.

Nevertheless, the Russian commanders were still seeking for a suitable employment for the volunteers, especially as their lack of discipline often forced the regular Russian troops to intervene to maintain order among them. Gorchakov again dismissed suggestions that they be disbanded, but stressed that his decision was mainly to ensure that they would not starve to death.

=== Crimea and Sevastopol ===
At this point, the thoughts of both the Russian command and the Greek volunteers increasingly turned to the Crimea, where British, French, and Ottoman forces had landed. Already in September, Emperor Nicholas I of Russia suggested attaching them to the extant Greek Battalion of Balaklava, while the Greeks also sent a stream of letters to the Russian commanders pleading to be moved to Crimea and gainfully employed there. General Alexander von Lüders supported their wish, and suggested that after the end of the war, the Greeks might be settled in the Crimea. It appears that this suggestion found a favourable reception with the Emperor, since the Greeks could replace the Crimean Tatars who had surrendered to the allied forces.

On 5 January [O.S. 24 December] 1855, the five companies of Greek volunteers, numbering 823 men, left Izmail for Odessa, where they arrived twelve days later. The Odessa Greek community collected funds for their upkeep, and the corps was reinforced with new recruits, in large part from those volunteers who had been discharged in 1854, but also with new arrivals. There were hopes that as many as 500–600 new recruits could be gathered, and Captain Antonios Gines was appointed as recruiting agent. Gines made his base at Kishinev, where he was to gather the recruits and, after careful selection, send them on to the Crimea in groups of sixty. The volunteers were to be promised the right to settle in the Crimea after the war.

In early February, the Greek Legion, some 700 strong, arrived at Eupatoria in the Crimea. At this time, a member of the princely Phanariote Mourouzis family who had followed the Russian withdrawal from Moldavia to Bessarabia, was appointed as commander of the Greek Legion. The Legion fought in the Battle of Eupatoria on 17 February, which ended in a Russian defeat, the Greeks suffering about sixty casualties. In the aftermath of the battle, the Legion was sent into Sevastopol to reinforce the garrison during the siege of the city. They arrived in early March, with a complement of 823 men.

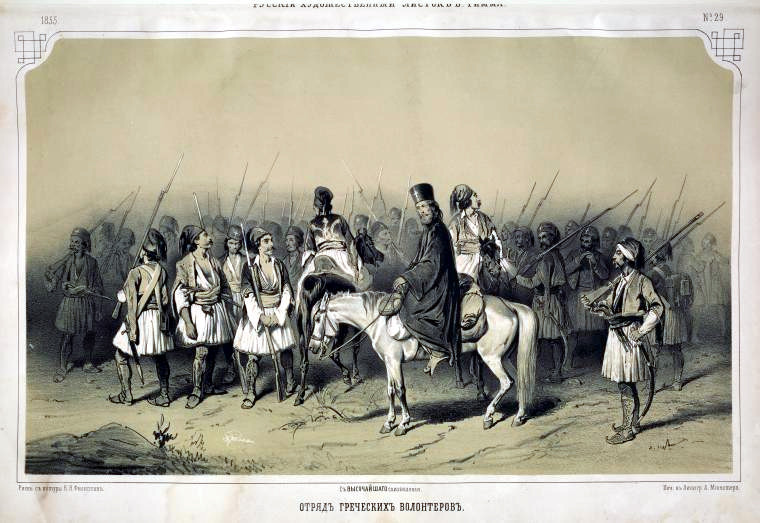
A squad of volunteers, and the priest-captain Papadoukas, by Vasily Timm

Prince Pavel Aleksandrovich Urusov, appointed the Legion's provisional commander until the arrival of Mourouzis, was dismayed at the disorderly picture the Legion presented:

"There exists neither discipline nor any organization. The volunteers absent themselves from distant hospitals and arrive here without any document whatever; the other ranks do not obey the officers; the company commanders, of whom no responsibility is sought, are only in formal command of the companies".

Urusov made recommendations for instilling discipline by means of a formal organization of the Legion; Mourouzis and the Sevastopol garrison's chief of staff, Prince Viktor Ilarionovich Vasilchikov were tasked with drawing up a draft. The attempts to regularize the Greek Legion included the insistence, by Mourouzis and many officers, that the Greeks abandon the fustanella and adopt uniforms that were similar to the Russian ones; a suggestion vehemently opposed by Chrysovergis. It was also recommended that the volunteers be rearmed; they were good marksmen, but armed mostly with flintlocks whose ammunition would be difficult to come by in the besieged city.

Following the death of Emperor Nicholas I on 2 March [O.S. 18 February] 1855, the Legion received the name "Greek Legion of Emperor Nicholas I" (Russian: Греческий легион императора Николая I). The Greeks suffered in Sevastopol, especially from the typhus that broke out in February: of the 743 men on the lists in late March, almost 200 were hospitalized. According to Chrysovergis, 96 died of typhus. The hardships and disease, as well as the realization that the hoped-for liberation of the Balkans from Ottoman rule was receding into the distant future, also demoralized many volunteers; about a hundred resigned.

In early April, the Greeks were withdrawn from the city itself to the environs, where Prince Mourouzis tried to improve the corps' discipline and training, and give it a more regular character. The Legion was divided in two commands, one headed by Papadoukas and the other by Chrysovergis. In May, Chrysovergis with thirty men were again sent into Sevastopol, to replace a contingent of Plastuns. In an engagement against the French in July, Chrysovergis distinguished himself enough to be decorated and placed in charge of a part of the Russian line at Maly Kurgan.

Following the end of the siege and the Russian retreat, followed by the start of the diplomatic talks that ended the war, the Greek Legion was superfluous. In November, after another incident of unruliness in the corps, Mourouzis was replaced by Grigorios Kantakouzinos. Kantakouzinos again tried to impose discipline, and get the volunteers to accept the regulations. However, only 150 men under Papathanasopoulos—an officer held in high esteem by Chrysovergis, but completely unmentioned in the Russian sources—stayed on, while the rest refused to obey and were discharged. The former volunteers mostly headed for Bessarabia, where they tried to eke out an existence until the war's end. Although again they were helped by the Odessa Greek community, many of them were soon in dire straits. According to the historian Maria Todorova,

"the files of the Russian war ministry are full of pleas by Greeks and Bulgarians from the beginning of 1856 who, left penniless, begged for a job or assistance".

== Disbandment ==
Following the conclusion of the Treaty of Paris on 30 March 1856, the rest of the Legion were discharged as well. The issue of their repatriation now became paramount: the c. 500 men in Bessarabia were to assemble in Odessa, and those still in the Crimea at Sevastopol, for embarkation to Greece. Over 300 of them arrived at Piraeus in June, but the Greek government refused to admit them into the country, arguing that many were not actually Greek citizens, but most likely the refusal was the result of the ongoing Anglo-French occupation of Piraeus. Faced with these difficulties, in August Emperor Alexander II of Russia signed a decree allowing the volunteers to settle in Russia. The Russians knew, however, that most of the volunteers intended to return to their homelands in Ottoman territories, especially after the Treaty of Paris granted them amnesty. A few did however settle in Russia, mostly in the Greek colonies around Mariupol, but also in Odessa and Chișinău.

In total, more than 1200 volunteers served in the Legion. 730 of them received the medal "For the Defence of Sevastopol", while 31 received the highest Russian military decoration, the Cross of St. George.

As early as 1864, a memorial was planned to be erected at Sevastopol commemorate the Greek volunteers, but it was not realized until 2016, as part of the "Russia year" in Greece, with funds from the Russian state, the Greek diaspora, and Sevastopol authorities.

== See also ==
- Greek Battalion of Balaklava
- Greek Legion (Septinsular Republic)

== Sources ==
- Pinchuk, Sergei Aleksandrovich (3 September 2011). "Cулинское дело капитана Xрисовери" [The Sulina Case of Captain Chrysovergis] (in Russian). Военно-исторический журнал.
- Todorova, Maria (1984). "The Greek Volunteers in the Crimean War". Balkan Studies. 25: 539–563. ISSN 2241-1674.
- Ulunyan, Ar. A. (2013). "26 сентября 1854 г. (Греческие защитники Балаклавы в британской мемуаристике)" [24 September 1854 (Greek Defenders of Balaklava in the British Memoirs]. Греки Балаклавы и Севастополя [Greeks of Balaklava and Sevastopol] (PDF) (in Russian). Moscow: Indrik. pp. 107–128. ISBN 978-5-91674-250-3.
