= Vladimir Yegoryev =

Russian and Soviet general (1869–1948)

Vladimir Nikolayevich Yegoryev
- Born: March 16, 1869 Moscow, Russian Empire
- Died: September 20, 1948 (aged 79) Moscow, Soviet Union
- Allegiance: Russian Empire; RSFSR
- Branch: Imperial Russian Army
- Conflicts: World War I Russian Civil War

Vladimir Nikolayevich Yegoryev (Russian: Влади́мир Никола́евич Его́рьев; March 16, 1869 – September 20, 1948) was a military commander and military expert of the Russian Empire, Russian SFSR, and Soviet Union.

== World War I ==
From November 10, 1914, he was commander of the 12th Grenadier Astrakhan Regiment, and then commanded the 5th Grenadier Kiev Regiment. Since November 19, 1915 he was Chief of Staff of the 1st Grenadier Division and from February 8, 1917, Chief of Staff of the 3rd Army Corps. On May 4, 1917, Yegoryev, who enjoyed great confidence of the new authorities and as a "supporter of democratic reforms", was appointed commander of the 171st Infantry Division. After LG Kornilov's speech, when many unreliable commanders lost their posts, Yegoryev was appointed commander of the 39th Army Corps on September 9, 1917, and was awarded the rank of Lieutenant-General.

== Service in the Red Army ==
After the October Revolution, he was elected as commander of the Special Army of the South-Western Front in December 1917. From January 1918 he commanded the troops of the South-Western Front. From March to September 1918 he was the military leader of the Western Curtain.

In July–October 1919 he commanded the troops of the Southern Front against the troops of Denikin, but failed to achieve results in the Counteroffensive of the Southern Front.

In 1920, he was a military expert with the Soviet delegation for the conclusion of the Tartu Peace Treaty, between the RSFSR and Finland and the Riga Peace Treaty with Poland. In the years 1921-1926, he had assignments at the Revolutionary Military Council of the USSR, and was editor of the magazine Military Thought and Revolution, and later taught at higher military educational institutions.

He retired in 1934, but continued teaching. He died in Moscow in 1948, and was buried at the Novodevichy Cemetery.

Preceded by Vladimir Gittis	Commander of the Southern Front (RSFSR); 13.07.1919 — 11.10.1919	Succeeded by Alexander Yegorov
