= 7th Infantry Division (Russian Empire) =

- 7-я пехотная дивизия
- Active: 1806 – c. 1918
- Country: Russian Empire
- Branch: Russian Imperial Army
- Role: Infantry
- Size: approx. 20,000
- Garrison/HQ: Radom; Voronezh
- Engagements: World War I

The 7th Infantry Division (Russian: 7-я пехотная дивизия, 7-ya pekhotnaya diviziya) was an infantry formation of the Russian Imperial Army that existed in various formations from the early 19th century until the end of World War I and the Russian Revolution. The division was based in Radom and later Voronezh in the years leading up to 1914. It fought in World War I and was demobilized in 1918.

== Organization ==
Russian infantry divisions consisted of a staff, two infantry brigades, and one artillery brigade. The 7th Infantry Division was part of the 5th Army Corps.

- 1st Brigade (HQ Voronezh):
  - 25th Smolensk Infantry Regiment
  - 26th Mogilev Infantry Regiment
- 2nd Brigade (HQ Tambov):
  - 27th Vitebsk Infantry Regiment
  - 28th Polotsk Infantry Regiment
- 7th Artillery Brigade

== Chiefs of Staff ==
- 1878-1885: Waldemar Schauman
- 1897-1899: Vladislav Klembovsky
- 1905: Nikolai Kalachyov
- 1909: Vladimir Zheltyshev
- 1912-1914: Józef Dowbor-Muśnicki
- January 15-26, 1917: Alexander Andreyevich Svechin
