= 27th Vitebsk Infantry Regiment =

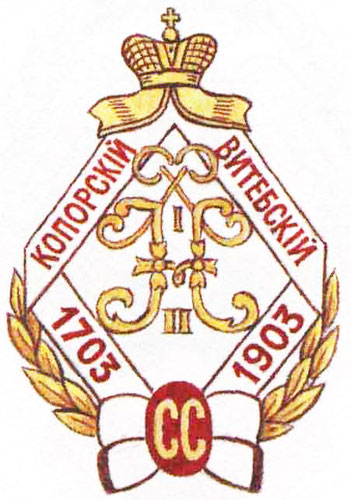
- Insignia
- Active: 1703 - 1918
- Country: Russian Empire
- Allegiance: Russian Imperial Army
- Branch: Army
- Garrison/HQ: Rzhyshchiv
- Engagements: Russo-Turkish War (1768–1774); War of the Second Coalition; French invasion of Russia; War of the Sixth Coalition; Crimean War; World War I

The 27th Vitebsk Infantry Regiment was an infantry unit of the Russian Imperial Army.

== Military kit ==
The regiment's soldiers wore white tabs on the collar of their greatcoats.

== History ==
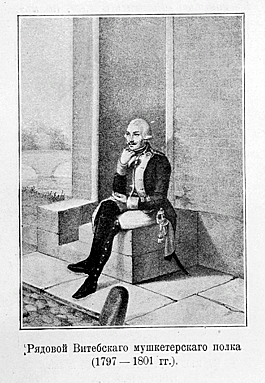
Витебский, 27-й пехотный, полк (Vitebsk, 27th Infantry Regiment) in Sytin's Military Encyclopedia

The regiment was formed on December 6, 1703, in Kazan.

During the The Palace Coup of 1762, the regiment was stationed in St. Petersburg and arrived in Petergof on the day of Catherine II's accession to the throne.

Having taken part in War of the Second Coalition, the regiment went to Sevastopol to be transferred by Varakhail to the island of Corfu, where it fought in battles with the French in Dalmatia and Montenegro as part of the Second Archipelago Expedition. In one of the battles of 1806, the regiment's chief, Major General M. K. Musin-Pushkin, died.

During the First World War it took part in the Lake Naroch offensive and in the Battle at Berestechko in July 1916.

== Chain of command ==
In 1914, the regiment was a part of the 2nd Infantry Brigade, which was a part of the 7th Infantry Division.
