= Aleksei Gutor =

Russian and Soviet general (1868–1938)

- Алексей Евгеньевич Гутор
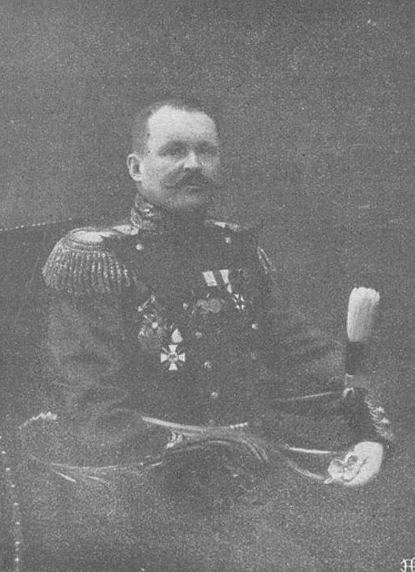
- Born: August 30, 1868; Voronezh, Russian Empire
- Died: August 13, 1938 (aged 69); Moscow, RSFSR, Soviet Union
- Military career
- Allegiance: Russian Empire
- Branch: (Russian Empire) Imperial Russian Army
- Service years: 1886–1917
- Rank: Lieutenant general
- Commands: Southwestern Front
- Conflicts: Russo-Japanese War; World War I
- Other work: Professor of Strategy and Tactics at the Military Academy of the Red Army

Aleksei Yevgenievich Gutor (Russian: Алексей Евгеньевич Гутор; 30 August 1868 – 13 August 1938) was a Russian lieutenant-general and Front commander during the First World War.

Born in Voronezh in a noble family, Gutor joined the Imperial Army. During the First World War Gutor commanded the 6th Corps from March 1916, which he commanded during the Brusilov Offensive. Gutor then commanded the 11th Army from 15 April 1917 to 21 May 1917, when he was elevated to Front command. From 22 May 1917 to 10 July 1917 Gutor commanded the Southwestern Front during the early stages of the Kerensky Offensive. After the Russian Revolution and the Bolshevik takeover, Gutor placed himself at the disposal of the Red Army. He was appointed Chairman of the Statute Commission, conducted military science courses, and advised the commander-in-chief of all the armed forces of the republic. In the summer of 1920, he was transferred to Siberia as an adviser to the command, but soon afterwards he was arrested in Omsk under accusations of counterrevolutionary activity and transferred to the Moscow Butyrka prison. His case was declared closed by the Presidium of the GPU in November 1922 because of lack of evidence and Gutor was released from custody. He subsequently became Professor of Strategy and Tactics at the Military Academy of the Red Army. In January 1931 he was released from office and was executed seven years later during the Great Purge at the age of 69 in Moscow.
