= 10th Infantry Division (Russian Empire) =

- 10-я пехотная дивизия
- Active: 1806 – c. 1918
- Country: Russian Empire
- Branch: Russian Imperial Army
- Role: Infantry
- Size: approx. 20,000
- Garrison/HQ: Warsaw; Nizhny Novgorod
- Engagements: World War I

The 10th Infantry Division (Russian: 10-я пехотная дивизия, 10-ya pekhotnaya diviziya) was an infantry formation of the Russian Imperial Army that existed in various formations from the early 19th century until the end of World War I and the Russian Revolution. The division was based in Warsaw and later Nizhny Novgorod in the years leading up to 1914. It fought in World War I and was demobilized in 1918.

== Organization ==
The 10th Infantry Division was part of the 5th Army Corps.

- 1st Brigade (HQ Nizhny Novgorod)
  - 37th Yekaterinburg Infantry Regiment
  - 38th Tobolsk Infantry Regiment
- 2nd Brigade (HQ Kozlov):
  - 39th Tomsk Infantry Regiment
  - 40th Kolyvan Infantry Regiment
- 10th Artillery Brigade

== Commanders ==
- 1915–1916: Vasily Timofeyvich Gavrilov
- 1916-1917: Dmitry Nikolayevich Nadyozhny
