= Dmitry Shcherbachev =

Russian General of the Infantry (1857–1932)

- Russian: Дми́трий Григо́рьевич Щербачёв
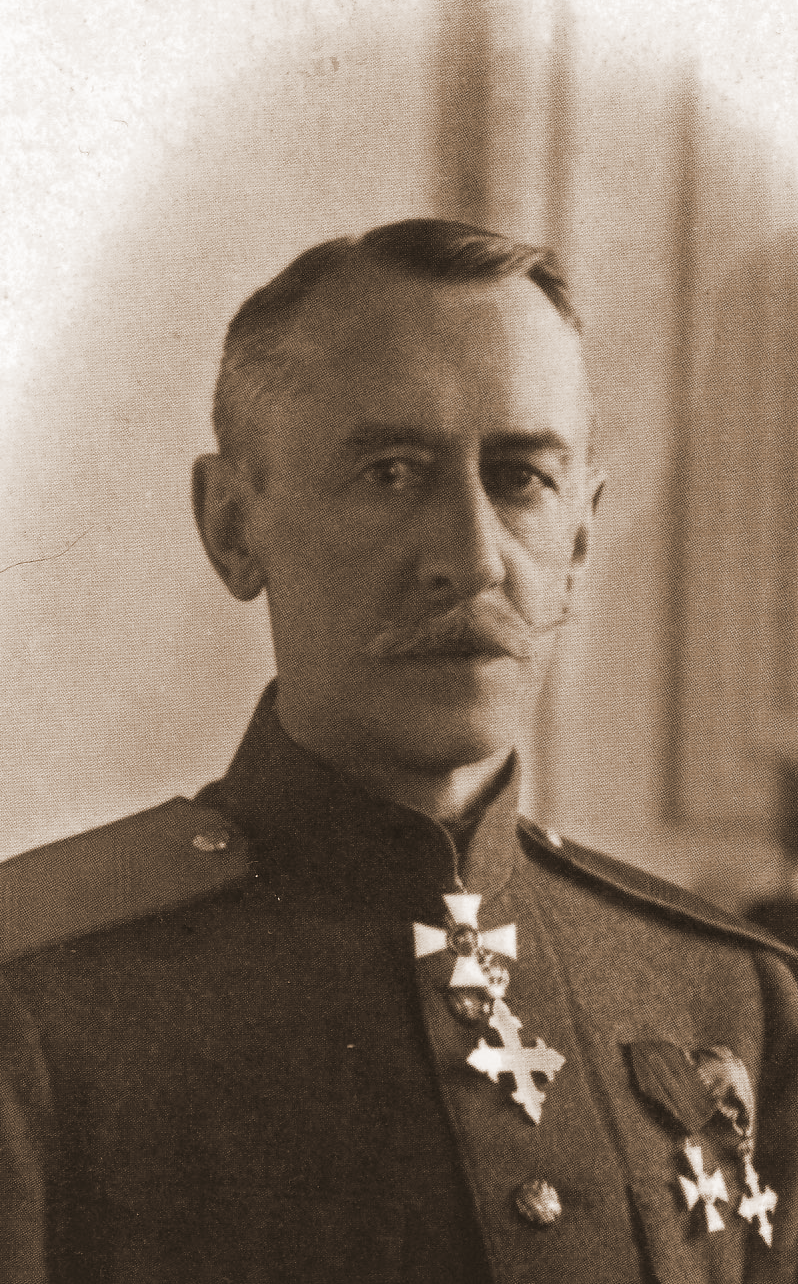
- General Dmitry Shcherbachev in 1930
- Born: 18 February [O.S. 6 February] 1857; Ruza, Moscow Governorate, Russian Empire
- Died: 18 January 1932 (aged 74); Nice, France
- Burial place: Cimetière orthodoxe de Caucade, Nice, France
- Military career
- Allegiance: Russian Empire; Russian Republic; Ukrainian People's Republic; White Movement
- Branch: (Russian Empire) Russian Imperial Army (Ukrainian People's Republic) Ukrainian People's Army (Russian Republic) White Army
- Service years: 1873–1920
- Rank: General of the Infantry
- Commands: 9th Army Corps (1912-1915); 11th Army (WW1 in 1915); 7th Army (WW1 in 1915-1917); Romanian Front (WW1 in 1917)
- Conflicts: Russo-Japanese War; World War I Russian Civil War

Dmitry Grigoryevich Shcherbachev (Russian: Дми́трий Григо́рьевич Щербачёв; 18 February [O.S. 6 February] 1857 – 18 January 1932) was a general in the Russian Army during World War I and one of the leaders of the White Movement during the Russian Civil War.

== Biography ==
=== Early life ===
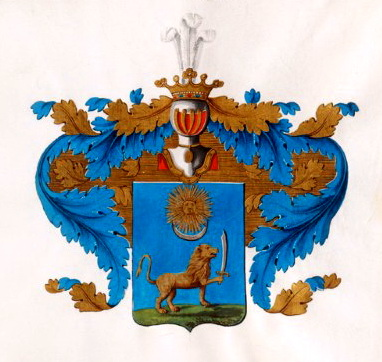
Coat of arms of the Shcherbachev family (ru)

Shcherbachev was born on 6 February [O.S. 25 January] 1857 (6th was according to the Julian calendar at use in Russia at the time) near Ruza, Moscow Governorate in the Russian Empire. He came from the Russian noble Shcherbachev family (ru) which originated from the Golden Horde. His father was Major-General Grigory Dmitriyevich Shcherbachev.

=== Military career ===
Shcherbachev graduated from the Orel Military Gymnasium in 1873 and the Mikhailovsky Artillery School in 1876. In 1877, he was transferred to the Life Guards Horse Artillery Brigade as an ensign, and he reached the rank of second lieutenant by 1878, and first lieutenant by 1881.

In 1884, Shcherbachev graduated from the Nikolayev Academy of General Staff in the first category, after which he stayed in the Petersburg Military District. He served in the Imperial Guards until 1907, after which he became the head of the Nikolayev Military Academy, and played an important role in introducing reforms into the academy. In 1912, he became the commander of the 9th Army Corps, which he led into WWI.

=== World War I ===
General Shcherbachev commanded the 11th Army, replacing General Andrey Selivanov, who resigned due to poor health. His army participated in the Invasion of Galicia in the Southwestern Front. After the successful battle on the Austrian soil, he took the initiative and took possession of the city of Lemberg, for which he was awarded the Order of St. George of the 4th degree and was also awarded the St. George Sword.

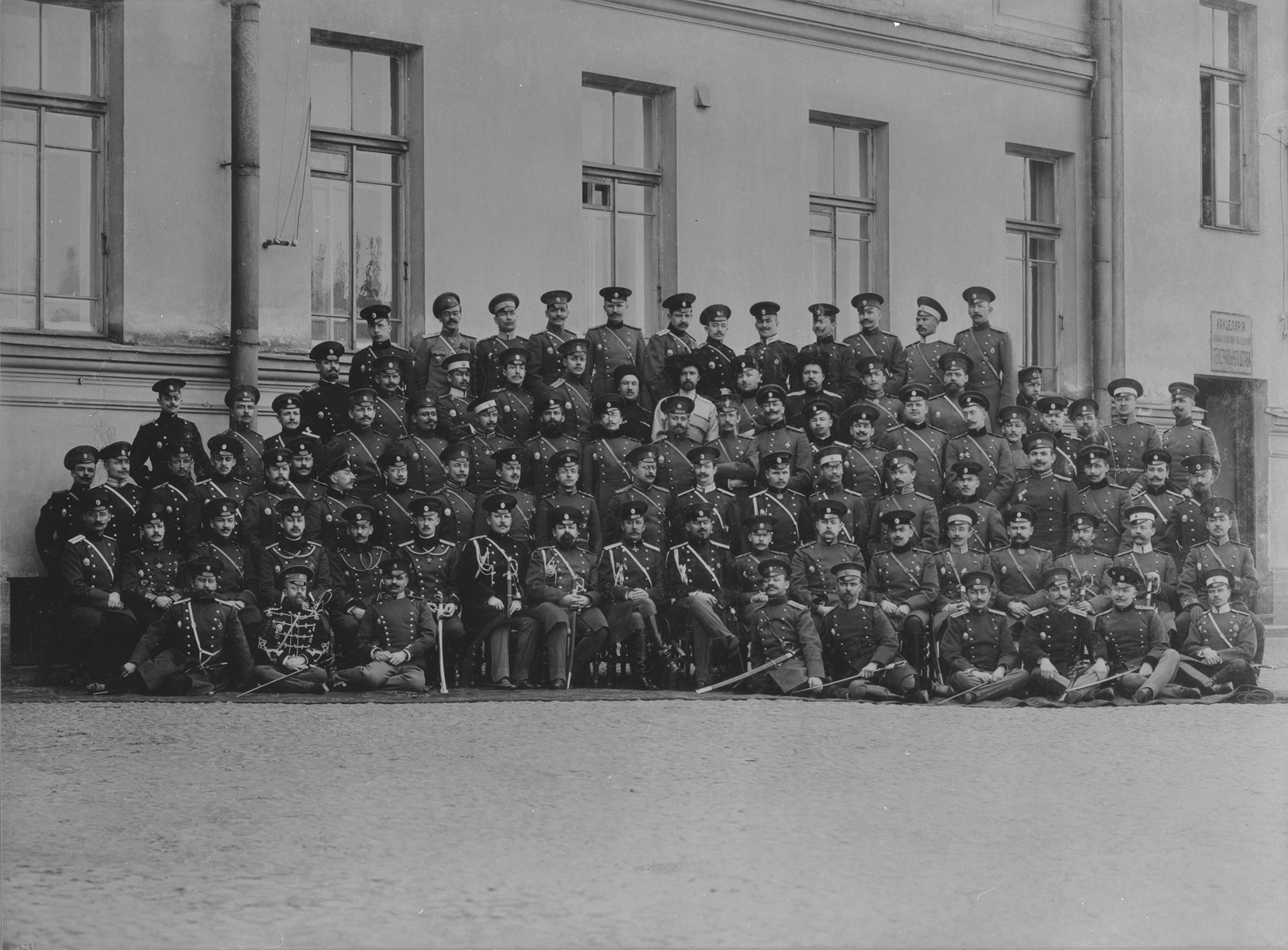
General Shcherbachev (second row sitting-9th one from the left) with the graduates of the Nikolayev academy of General Staff

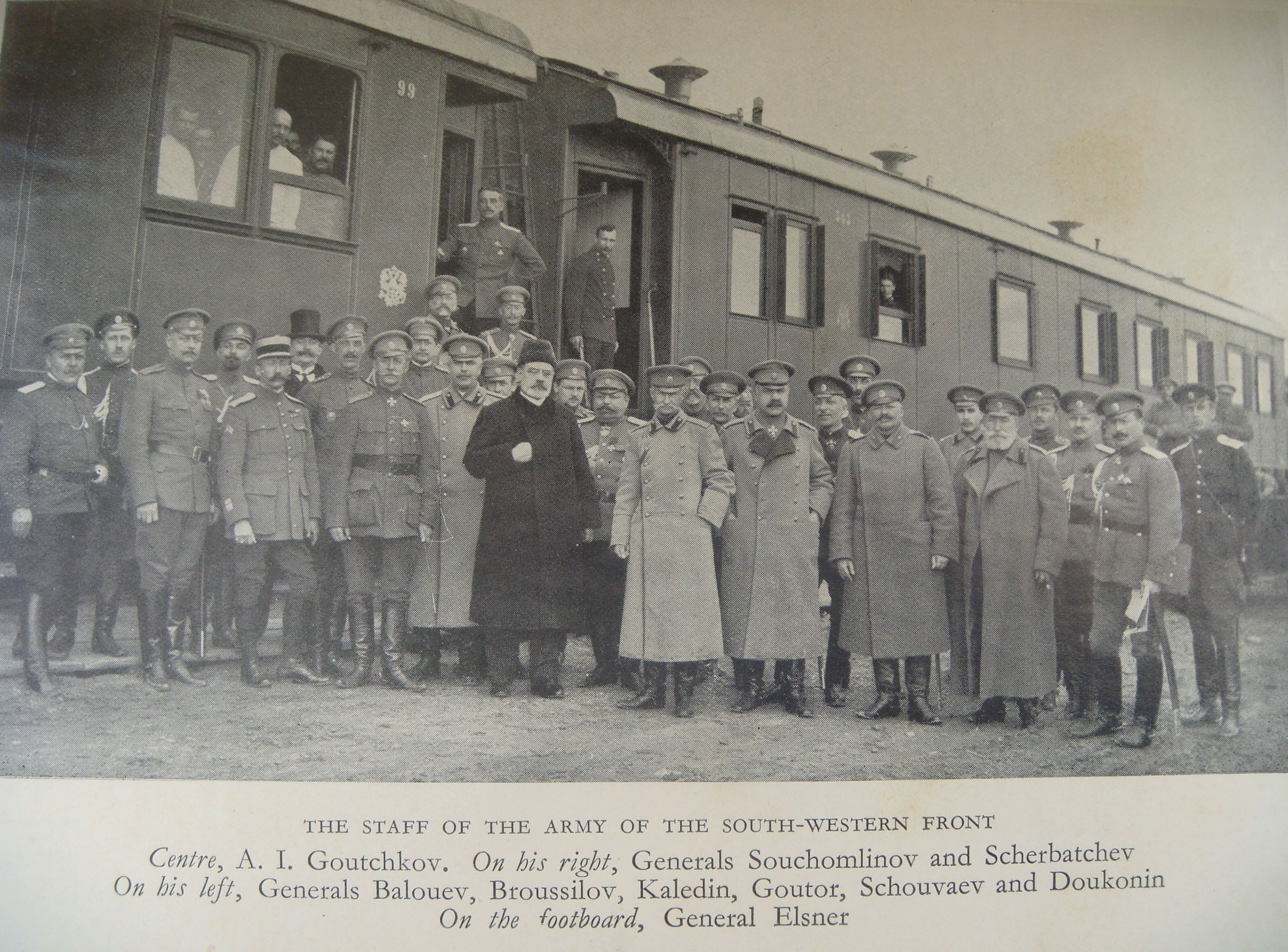
General Shcherbachev (fourth one from the left in the first row, Alexander Guchkov and General Brusilov to his left)

For the fact that in the battles of the mountains. Lemberg and in especially persistent battles under the mountains. The Rawa-Russian manifestation of a special viability and tireless energy in the management of troops, thanks to a coalition result, remote attempts at battle, and also troops took many guns, charging boxes, ammunition, prisoners, and the direct fall of the mountains. Lemberg is obligated to its orders.

In mid-September 1914, he led the siege detachment (6.5 divisions), which carried out the siege of the Fortress of Przemyśl. On September 2, his detachment conducted an unsuccessful assault on the fortress, and inflicted the main blow at Sedliski. On 25 September (October 8), a relief force of Austro-Hungarian troops approached the fortress, and on 9 September, the siege detachment of General Shcherbachev was disbanded.

For the excellent leadership of the troops entrusted to him by the army in the battles of the second half of August 1915, of which the battles of August 24–25 under the Island and Draganovka were especially successful, and in the battles of 11-15th and 22-25th September and 8th, October 1915, with the troops of this army during the period from August 17 to October 10 taken prisoner 934 officers and 52895 lower ranks and captured 36 guns and 149 machine guns.

In October 1915, he was promoted to General of the Infantry, and was appointed to general-adjutant. He also replaced Vladimir Nikitin as commander of the 7th Army. Under his command, the 7th Army was able to win numerous battles at the Strypa River during the Brusilov Offensive.

=== February Revolution ===
Shortly after the February Revolution, Shcherbachev was appointed deputy to the Commander-in-Chief of the Romanian Front (King Ferdinand I), replacing General Andrei Zayonchkovski. The front was established in 1916 to connect to the defeated Romanian Army, also to prevent the threats to the south of Russia. As deputy commander-in-chief of the front, he had four Russian and two Romanian armies subordinate to him.

In July 1917, the Russo-Romanian forces commanded by General Alexandru Averescu defeated the Austro-German forces at Mărăști, but they failed to develop further success due to the telegram from the minister-chairman of the Provisional Government, Alexander Kerensky, who ordered the stop of the offensive in connection with the German breakthrough at Tarnopol. In late July to August 1917, the Russo-Romanian forces successfully repelled the Austro-German forces led by German Generalfeldmarschall August von Mackensen at Mărășești.

=== Russian Civil War ===
General Shcherbachev managed to prevent the disintegration and was able to keep order in the army for some time under the influence of the revolutionary events and Bolshevik agitation. In late October 1917, he learned the front-line committee decided not to recognize the Bolshevik power. In the end of 1917, Shcherbachev and his loyal troops were able to establish connection with General Mikhail Alekseyev, the former chief of staff of the army during WW1, who had arrived at the Don, where the Bolsheviks were assembled. As a result, the Romanian Front had the idea of creating a Corps of Russian Volunteers for its subsequent dispatch to the Don. In early November 1917, an organization was formed in Iași, the purpose of which was the formation of a reliable detachment capable of becoming the basis for the creation of the White Army. The organization not only unified officers, but also soldiers. This work was all supervised by General Shcherbachev.

In December 1917, with the consent of Shcherbachev, Romania invaded Bessarabia. Under the pretext that the Russian and Romanian border and maintaining the order and tranquility in the rear of Romanian Army. In January 1918, the Romanians met the Reds and fighting broke out between them, the Romanian division which moved to the left bank of the Dniester River, was defeated. A peace treaty was signed in Iași, and the Romanians undertook to clean Bessarabia. However, the Germans came to the aid of Romania. On the same day, Romania surrendered and signed a treaty with Germany and Austria-Hungary, One of the coalitions concluded that Bessarabia would be transferred to Romania. In April 1918 Shcherbachev refused to hold the office and informed the Allied ambassadors in Iași. After that, he went to the estate granted by the Romanian king.

In early January 1919, Shcherbachev arrived in France through Serbia and Italy. After arriving, he formed a representative office, which was in charge of supplying the White Army, and to form volunteer armies from Russian prisoners of war. In February, Admiral Alexander Kolchak confirmed his post. He also chaired the Military and Naval Commission of the Russian Political Conference which - led by the Russian Political Delegation - represented the White Russian Governments at the Peace Conference in Versailles. Leaving Paris in May with M. S. Adzhemov and V.V. Vyrubov. In June 1919, General Shcherbachev arrived in Yekaterinodar to General Anton Denikin's bid, where he persuaded General Denikin to recognize the supreme position of Admiral Kolchak.

In May 1920, due to a disagreement with Lieutenant-General Pyotr Wrangel about the acceptability of the cases with Poland, he resigned his post. He was subsequently replaced by General Yevgeni Miller. Based on his assessment of the international situation, Shcherbachev believed that the denying assistance to the Poles was far more in line with the interest of the Whites. In his opinion, if the Poles were completely defeated by the Reds, France might defend the Poles by deploying huge numbers of troops to launch large-scale attacks against the Reds, or the victorious Bolsheviks might be distracted by the defeated Poles or even by the Germans.

In either case, the position of Wrangel's Army would be greatly improved. So Shcherbachev advised General Wrangel not to launch any offensive, diverting the Bolshevik forces from the Polish Front.

=== Later life ===
After his resignation, he moved to Nice, where he lived on a pension that was appointed to him by the Romanian Government. He was a monarchist, and was a member of the Sovereign of the Conference under Grand Duke Kirill Vladimirovich.

=== Death ===
He died 18 January 1932. He was buried with military honors by a French battalion of Chasseurs Alpins in the Russian Orthodox Cemetery in Nice. His funeral was attended by French representatives, Marshal Constantine Prezan, the Romanian commander-in-chief during WWI, General Nikolai Yudenich, the hero from the Caucasus Campaign, and many more.

== Honours ==
=== Domestic ===
- Order of St. Stanislaus, 3rd class (1879)
- Order of St. Anna, 3rd class (1885)
- Order of St. Stanislaus, 2nd class (1888)
- Order of St. Vladimir, 4th class (1891)
- Order of St. Anna, 2nd Class (1896)
- Order of St. Vladimir, 3rd class (1899)
- Order of St. Stanislaus, 1st class (1905)
- Order of St. Anna, 1st class (5.6.1911)
- Order of St. George, 4th class (EP 27.9.1914)
- Order of St. Vladimir, 2nd class with swords (VP 19.2.1915)
- St. George Sword (VP 23.4.1915)
- Order of St. George, 3rd class (VP 27.10.1915)
- Order of the White Eagle (1915)
- Order of St. Alexander Nevsky (VP 6.7.1916)

=== Foreign ===
- French Third Republic:
  - Legion of Honour, officer's cross (1897)
  - Legion of Honour, commander's cross (1911)
  - Legion of Honour, grand’croix (1918)
- Kingdom of Romania:
  - Order of the Crown, commander's cross (1899)
  - Order of Michael the Brave, 3rd class
  - Order of Michael the Brave, 2nd class
- Grand Duchy of Oldenburg:
  - House and Merit Order of Peter Frederick Louis, officer's cross (1903)
- Kingdom of Italy:
  - Order of Saints Maurice and Lazarus, commander's cross (1903)
- Qing dynasty:
  - Order of the Double Dragon, 2nd class (1911)
  - Order of the Double Dragon, 3rd class (1911)
- Kingdom of Montenegro:
  - Order of Prince Danilo I, 1st class (1912)
- Kingdom of Serbia:
  - Order of St. Sava, 1st class (1912)
