= Nikolai Khitrovo =

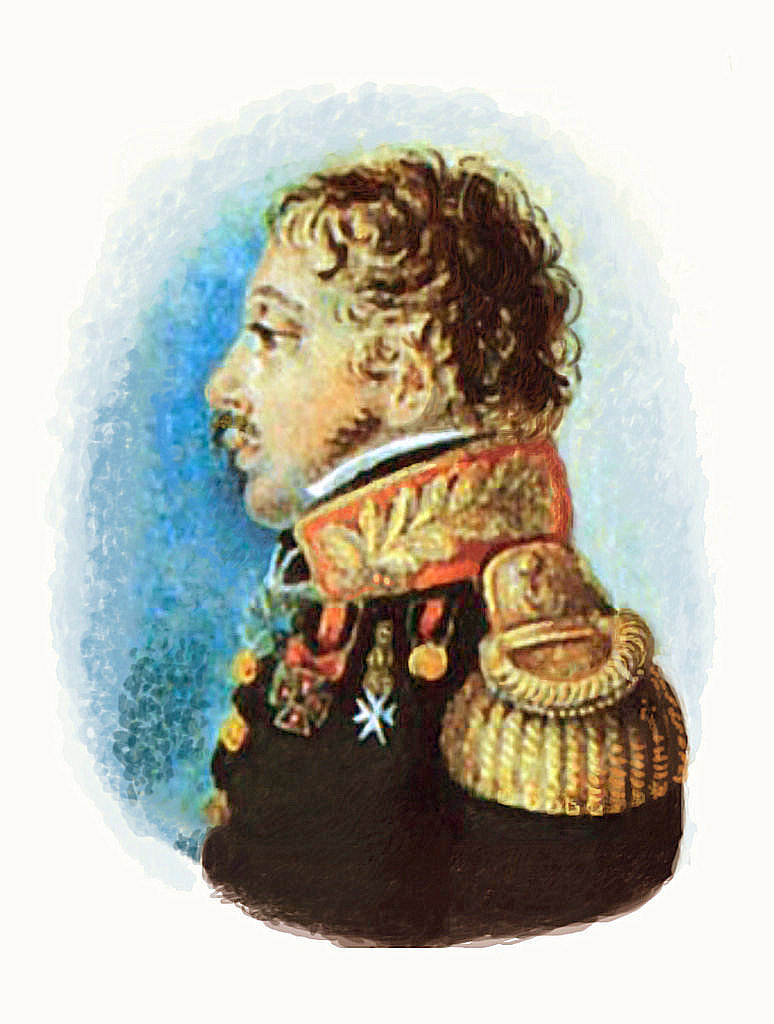
Khitrovo around 1810

Nikolai Khitrovo (1779–1826) was a Russian diplomat and orientalist known for his contributions to Russo-Persian relations in the 19th century.

== Biography ==
He was the second son of Zakhar Alexeïevitch Khitrovo (1734–1798) and his wife Alexandra Nikolaïevna Maslova (1754–1829). In 1786, he was one of the sergeants of the Izmaïlovski guards' regiment. He became an adjutant to Paul I of Russia in 1801 and fought in the campaigns from 1805 to 1811 but was discharged as unfit before the French invasion of Russia due to wounds received at the siege of Brailov in 1809. He, therefore, spent a year in Viatka before retiring to his lands in Kalouga district under police surveillance. He was only freed from there thanks to the intervention of his father-in-law Mikhail Kutuzov - Khitrovo's wife was Anna Mikhaïlovna, a friend of Pushkin. The couple had four sons and a daughter. The Khitrovka quarter is named after him in memory of a market he had established there near his townhouse.
