= Pyotr Baluyev =

Russian and Soviet general (1857–1923)

Pyotr Semyonovich Baluyev
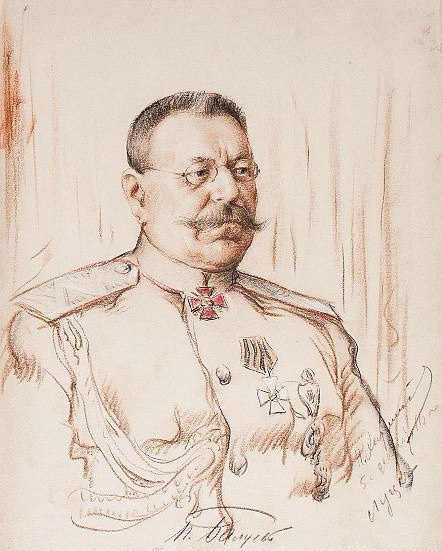
- Born: 21 June 1857
- Died: 1923 (aged 65–66) Moscow, Soviet Union
- Allegiance: Russian Empire; Soviet Union
- Branch: Imperial Russian Army; Soviet Red Army
- Commands: 2nd Brigade, 16th Infantry Division (Russian Empire); 11th Army (Russian Empire)
- Battles / wars: World War I

Pyotr Semyonovich Baluyev (Russian: Пётр Семёнович Балу́ев; 21 June 1857 – 1923) was an army general in the Imperial Russian Army and commander of the Southwestern Front from 24 July 1917 to 31 July 1917.

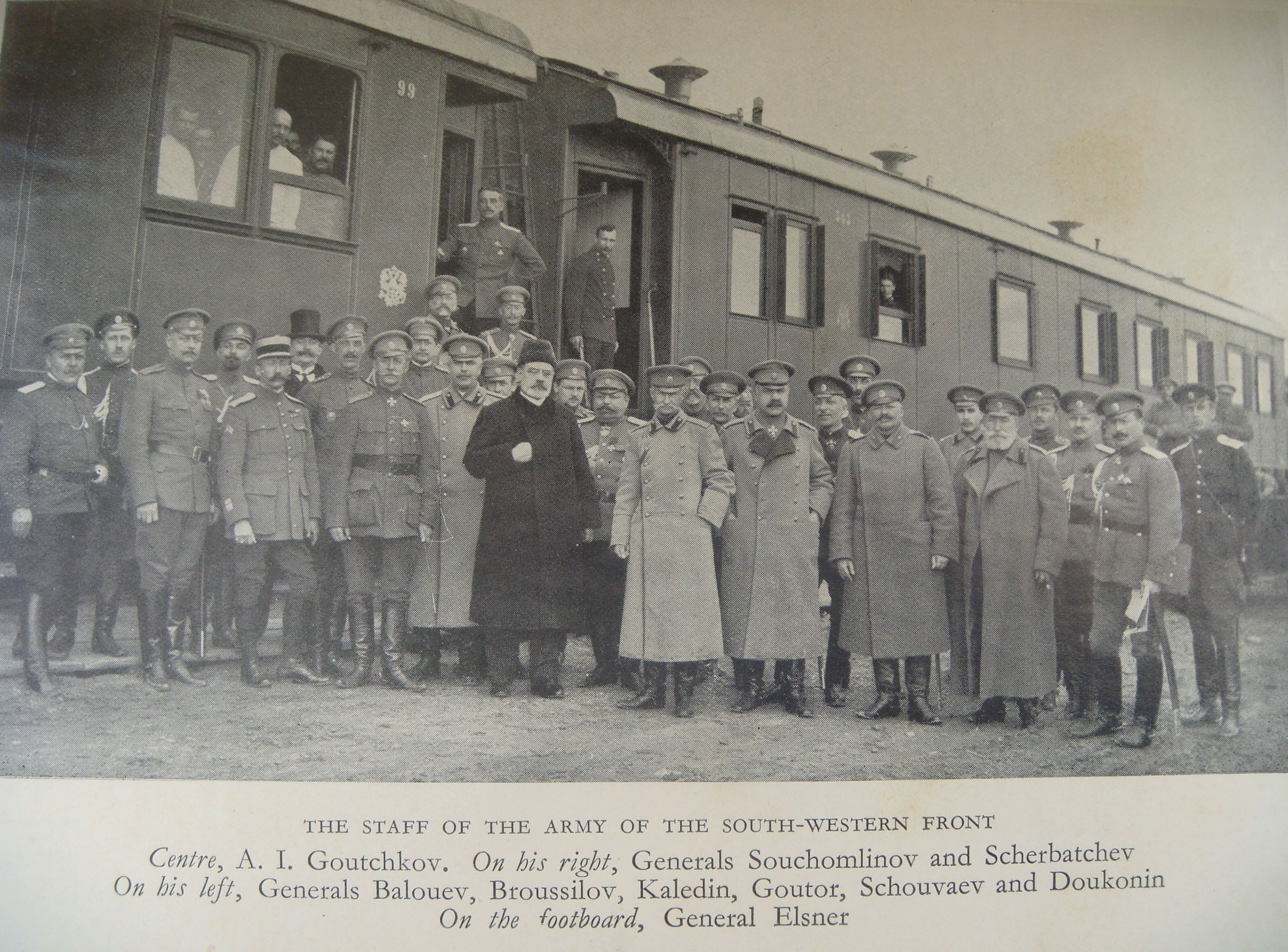
Staff of Russian army, WWI south-west front

== Biography ==
Baluyev was an inspector and an instructor in the Red Army under Bolshevik command after the Russian Revolution of 1917.

Preceded by	Commander of the 2nd Brigade, 16th Infantry Division; 1904	Succeeded by
Preceded by	Commander of the 11th Army; 29 April - 9 September 1917	Succeeded by
