= Vladislav Klembovsky =

Russian and Soviet general (1860–1921)

Vladislav Napoleonovich (Vladimir Nikolayevich) Klembovsky
- Владислав Наполеонович (Владимир Николаевич) Клембовский
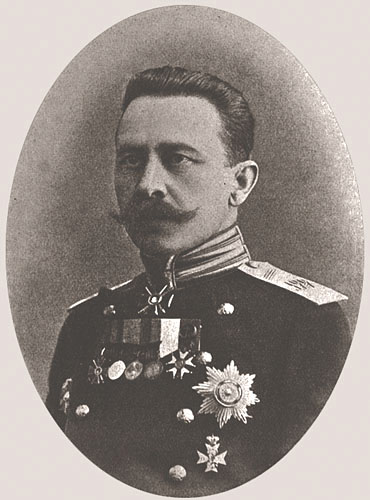
- Klembovskij Vladislav in 1920
- Born: June 28, 1860; Moscow Governorate
- Died: July 19, 1921 (aged 61)
- Occupation: Military commander during World War I

Vladislav Napoleonovich (Vladimir Nikolayevich) Klembovsky (Russian: Владислав Наполеонович (Владимир Николаевич) Клембовский; 28 June 1860 in Moscow Governorate – 19 July 1921) was a Russian military commander during World War I.

Alexander Kerensky, head of the Russian Provisional Government after the overthrow of the Tsar, appointed him Supreme Commander in Chief of the Russian Army in August 1917, replacing Lavr Kornilov.

Klembovsky later joined the Red Army as a volunteer, but was arrested after the Red army's defeat in Poland by the Bolsheviks and starved to death in prison.

== Commands ==
- 06.12.1915 – 30.01.1916 : 5th Army
- 25.10.1916 – 20.12.1916 : 11th Army
- 01.06.1917 – 29.08.1917 : Northern Front
