= 11th Army (Russian Empire) =

The Russian 11th Army was a World War I Russian field army that fought on the Eastern theatre of war.

Field management was established in October 1914. The unit fought on the Southwestern Front during the entire war. Its attempt to seize the Austrian-held fortress of Przemyśl in October 1914 failed, in part due to a lack of heavy artillery, and led to a siege that lasted until March 1915.

== Commanders ==
- 21 October 1914 – 4 April 1915 — General of Infantry Andrey Selivanov
- 4 April 1915 – 19 October 1915 — General of Infantry Dmitry Shcherbachev
- 19 October 1915 – 25 October 1916 — General of Infantry Vladimir Viktorovich Sakharov
- 25 October 1916 – 20 December 1916 — General of Infantry Vladislav Klembovsky
- 20 December 1916 – 4 April 1917 — General of Infantry Dimitri Bałanin
- 15 April 1917 – 21 May 1917 — Lieutenant-General Aleksei Gutor
- 25 May 1917 – 4 June 1917 — General of Infantry Ivan Fiedotov
- 4 June 1917 – 9 July 1917 — General of Cavalry Ivan Erdélyi
- 29 April 1917 – 9 September 1917 — General of Infantry Pyotr Baluyev
- 19 September 1917 – 29 August 1917 — Lieutenant-General Fiodor Rerberg
- 1 September 1917 – 1 December 1917 — Lieutenant-General Mikhail Promtov

== See also ==
- List of Russian armies in World War I
- List of Imperial Russian Army formations and units
