= Battle of the Vistula River =

Battle of First World War

- Part of the Eastern Front during World War I
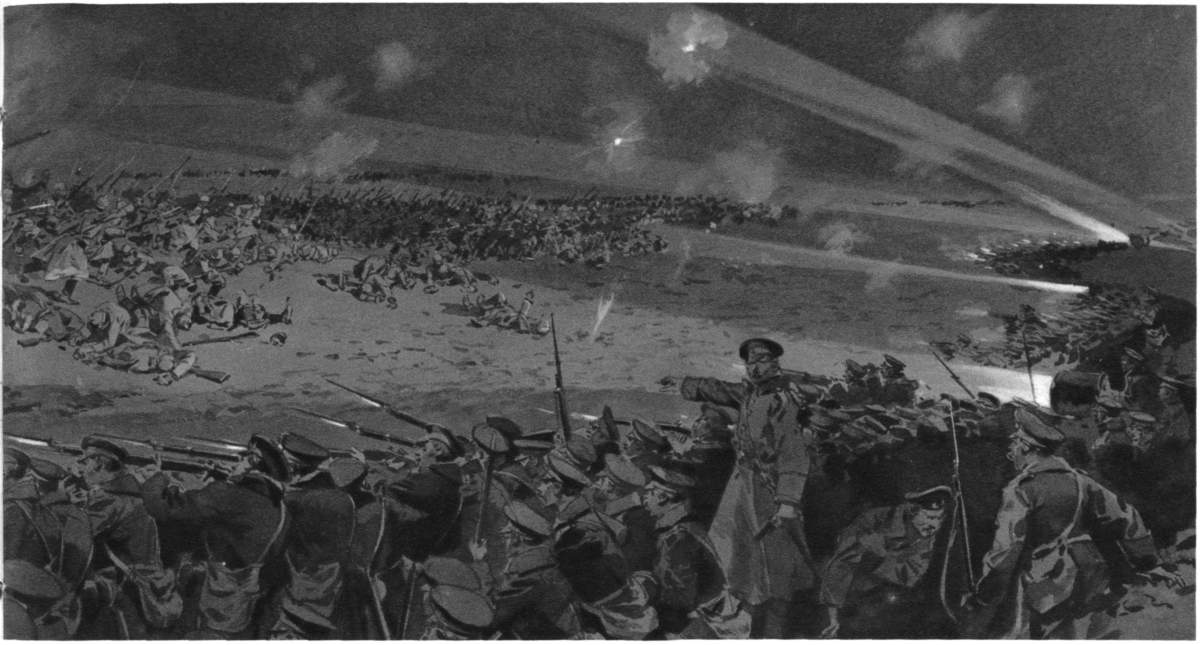
- Russian infantry repels a night German attack on the Vistula
Date	29 September – 31 October 1914
Location	Congress Poland, Russian Empire (present-day Poland)
Result	Russian victory
Territorial changes	Offensive of the Central Powers on the left bank of the Vistula is defeated: Russia regains control of almost the entire territory of Poland up to Silesia

Belligerents
German Empire; Austria-Hungary	Russian Empire: Congress Poland

Commanders and leaders
(German Empire) Paul von Hindenburg (German Empire) August von Mackensen (Austria-Hungary) Franz Conrad von Hötzendorf (Austria-Hungary) Viktor Dankl	Grand Duke Nicholas (Note: Commander-in-Chief); Nikolai Ruzsky (Note: Commander of the Northwestern Front); Sergei Sheydeman (Note: Commander of the 2nd Army); Aleksei Evert (Note: Commander of the 4th Army); Pavel Plehve (Note: Commander of the 5th Army); Alexei Schwartz (Note: Commander of the Ivangorod fortress)

Units involved
(German Empire) 9th Army (Austria-Hungary) 1st Army	2nd Army; 4th Army; 5th Army; 9th Army

Strength
321,000 (Note: 5th Army: 135,600 infantry 10,400 cavalry 1st Army: 155,000 infantry 20,000 cavalry)	470,000 to 494,600 (Note: 2nd Army: 148,000 men and 18,000 cavalry 5th Army: 75,700 men and 7,500 cavalry 4th Army: 96,400 and 12,000 cavalry 9th Army: 125,000 men and 12,000 cavalry)

Casualties and losses
78,077 to 150,000 (Note: 78,077; of which 25,193 Germans and 52,884 Austrians; 110,000; of which 75,000 Austrians; 150,000; of which 50,000 Germans)	65,000 to 148,864 (Note: "150,000")

The Battle of the Vistula River, (Note: German: Schlacht an der Weichsel) also known as the Battle of Warsaw and Ivangorod, (Note: Russian: Варшавско-Ивангородская операция) was a major Russian victory against Germany and Austria-Hungary on the Eastern Front during the First World War.

The battle is one of the largest and most important battles in the First World War, one of the most striking victories of the Russian army, which showed that the Russian troops were strong and could resist the Germans. Both sides suffered heavy losses. The battle also became a kind of psychological turning point. The Russians, believing in their own strength, recovered from the defeat at the Battle of Tannenberg, and became confident that they were superior to the Germans. This confidence helped them to win the Battle of Lodz a few days later.

== Background ==
By mid-September 1914 the Imperial Russian Army were driving the Austro-Hungarian Army deep into Galicia, threatening Kraków, and the Austro-Hungarian invasion of Serbia was floundering. The armies that the Russian commander Grand Duke Nicholas was assembling in Congress Poland were still enlarging, including the arrival of crack troops from Siberia, freed by the Japanese declaration of war against Germany on 23 August. Stavka (Russian supreme headquarters) intended for the forces assembled south of Warsaw—500,000 men and 2,400 guns—to march west to invade the German industrial area of Upper Silesia, which was almost undefended. On their Eastern Front the Germans had only the 8th Army, which was in East Prussia. It already had mauled two Russian armies at Tannenberg and at the First Battle of the Masurian Lakes. To support the reeling Austro-Hungarian Armies, OHL (Oberste Heeresleitung, German supreme headquarters) formed a new German 9th Army in Silesia, to be commanded by General Richard von Schubert, with Erich Ludendorff, transferred from 8th Army, as chief of staff. Ludendorff quickly evaluated the situation in Silesia and convinced the new commander at OHL, Erich von Falkenhayn, to strengthen the 9th Army and also to make Paul von Hindenburg commander of both German armies in the east.

By the end of September, 9th Army, with headquarters in Breslau, consisted of the XVII, XX, XI, Guard Reserve Corps, Graf von Bredow's Landwehr Division, 8th Cavalry Division, and the 35th Reserve Division, with Woyrsch's Landwehr Corps linking the German Army with the Austro-Hungarian forces on the right. According to Prit Buttar, "Several Siberian divisions were now gathered around Warsaw, and it seemed likely that these would march southwest to support a westerly drive by the forces of Southwest Front. In order to oppose this, Conrad and Ludendorff agreed, the k.u.k. Army would extend its northern flank north of the Vistula, and the German 9th Army would then take up positions alongside." On 28 September, the Germans started their advance, while Dankl's 1st Army crossed the Vistula, reaching Bogoria on 1 October. On 30 September, the Germans reached Przedbórz, and Radom five days later. The Russian response was for Ruzsky to advance towards Kalisz, while Ivanov's 2nd, 4th, 9th, and 5th Armies concentrated along the Vistula. The Russian 3rd and 8th Armies would remain in Galicia.

== Engagement of Opatów-Klimontów ==
To face the threat from Silesia, the Russians withdrew men from East Prussia and from the front facing the Austro-Hungarians The geographical barrier that separated the bulk of the opposing armies was the Vistula River. The Russian corps marching north to fill the gap moved along the east bank of the Vistula, which protected their left flanks. The troop movements involved both the Southwest Front commanded by Nikolai Ivanov and the Northwest Front under Nikolai Ruzsky. Their movements were poorly coordinated.

To guard the crossings for their 4th and 9th Armies, on the west bank of the Vistula the Russians deployed the 75th Reserve Division (4th Army) at Radom, as well as the group of General Delsalle, consisting of the Guard Rifle Brigade, 2nd Rifle Brigade and 80th Reserve Division, at Opatów-Klimontów. Both groups were screened by the Cavalry divisions of the Nowikow Corps.

On 28 September German 9th Army began a meticulously planned advance toward the Vistula River. German XI, Guard and Austro-Hungarian I Corps marched in heavy rain toward Delsalle's group. Because German Army wagons were too heavy for the woeful Polish roads, submerged in several feet of mud, they used light Polish carts hired along with their peasant drivers. As they advanced they improved the roads and bridges so they could support heavy artillery and adjusted the rails to the narrower European gauge. (The Vienna-Warsaw line was already European gauge.) Explosives were cached at road and railway bridges so they could be destroyed if necessary.

On 6 October, Dankl's 1st Army cavalry had reached Sandomierz, and though the Russians lost 7000 of General Delsalle's infantry killed or taken prisoner near Opatów, the remaining forces had withdrawn across the Vistula. On 7 October, Archduke Joseph Ferdinand's 4th Army captured Rzeszów, while Svetozar Boroević's 3rd Army advanced towards Przemyśl. On 11 October, Austro-Hungarian troops captured Jarosław, and 5000 prisoners, but once, again, the Russians were able to withdraw across the San River.

== Battle ==
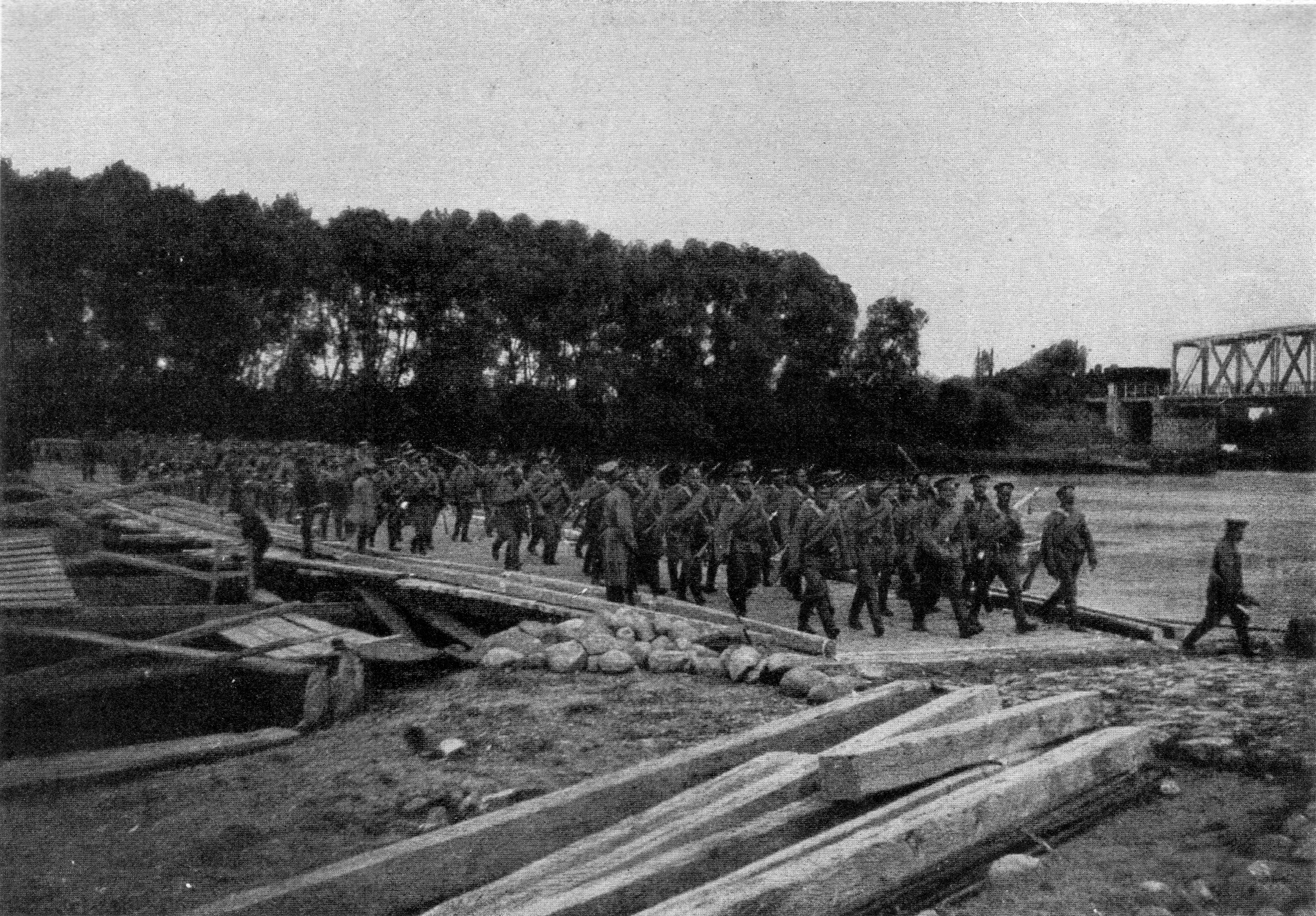
Russian soldiers crossing the Vistula River in 1914.

The Germans reached the Vistula River on 9 October. The few Russian bridgeheads on the west bank were invested. Their left flank, August von Mackensen's XVII Corps, continued to march north until it was 19 km (12 mi) from Warsaw. Only small Russian pockets remained on the west bank; they were excellent targets for the German artillery. General Nikolai Ruzsky, commander of the Russian Northwest Front, sent troops from Warsaw to attack XVII Corps on the German left flank. Orders found on the body of a Russian officer revealed that 14 Russian divisions were concentrating against Mackensen's five divisions. The Germans were also privy to Russian movements from intercepted wireless messages. Unlike the messages sent in the clear during the first weeks of the war, now they were in the new Russian code, which by the end of September had been broken by a German reserve officer, Professor Deubner. Three Russian armies were concentrating against German 9th Army, relieving the pressure on the Austro-Hungarians in the south.

On 10 October, the Russians were ordered to attack from their positions along the Vistula. The Russian 4th Army was deployed with its 14th, 17th and Guards Army Corps along the lower San and Vistula. North of them was the 9th Army with the 16th, Grenadier, and 3rd Caucasian Army Corps. 5th Army was still be deployed north of them, while closest to Warsaw was the 2nd Army, consisting of 1st, 27th and 2nd Siberian Army Corps. On 13 October, Grand Duke Nikolai placed command of the 2nd and 5th Russian armies under the command of the Northwest Front, responsible for the major thrust into Poland, while the Southwest Front tied down the German and Austro-Hungarian armies along the Vistula. However, on 11 October, the German 9th Army XVII Corps, under the command of Mackensen, was to attack Warsaw, securing the 9th Army's northern flank.

Mackensen was within 6 miles (9.7 km) of Warsaw, when a set of orders was found on a Russian staff officer corpse. According to Buttar, "For the first time, the Germans became aware that they were facing no fewer than four Russian armies, which intended to roll up the German line from the north. It now became the intention of Hindenburg and Ludendorff to try to tie down as much of the Russian strength as possible, thus allowing the k.u.k. Army to achieve a victory against weaker forces in the south." On 10 October, Conrad ordered the Austro-Hungarian 3rd and 4th Armies to cross the San, but by 12 October they had not made any headway, even the 1st Army failed to establish a bridgehead. Though the Austro-Hungarians had 36 divisions in Galicia compared to 26 for the Russians, but the Russians had more guns, and were fighting from defensive positions. On 11 October, Conrad sent the 1st Army's V Corps to Ożarów to reinforce the Germans along the left bank of the Vistula. On 12 October, the Russians succeeded in establishing a bridgehead at Ivangorod. The Russians attacked Mackensen on 16 October after two days of bombardment. Ludendorff requested Conrad send his 1st Army in response, but Conrad only agreed to send his 7th Cavalry Division. Macksen's eastern flank was threatened as Phleve's Russian 5th Army crossed the Vistula. Asked if he could hold his position until 18 October, allowing Hindenburg to withdraw to the southwest, Mackensen responded, "I will hold until 19 October." By then Russian cavalry had bypassed his western flank and threatened to cut him off to the south. Mackensen was then forced to withdraw, while Grand Duke Nikolai ordered a general offensive for 20 October.

By 20 October, Radko Dimitriev's Russian 3rd Army had established 5 bridgeheads across the San, which Ferdinand's Austro-Hungarian 4th Army was unable to dislodge. On 22 October, Aleksei Brusilov's Russian 8th Army recaptured Stryj. As the German and Austro-Hungarian forces withdrew to the west, Conrad planned an ambush of the Russians crossing at Ivangorod. As Sergei Sheydeman's Russian 2nd Army advanced, Dankl's 1st Army was to strike north against the southern flank of the Russian bridgehead on 22 October. Dankl's attack faltered, while the next day his eastern flank was threatened by Russian troops crossing the Vistula at Puławy. According to Buttar, "Conrad's plan to crush the Russians in the process of crossing the river, always a risky venture, would now face the combined strength of the Russian 4th and 9th Armies." As the German Guards Reserve Corps advanced towards Kozienice, at the western end of the Ivangorod bridgehead, another Russian bridgehead opened at Kazimierz Dolny, to the rear of Dankl's eastern front. On 25 October, the Russians advanced. On 26 October, the German Guards Reserve Corps retreated towards the southwest, along with the German 9th Army to avoid its western flank from being turned, forcing Dankl's 1st Army to also retreat.

The Austro-Hungarian 1st Army, which was taking over the German right flank, was unable to defend the crossings over the Vistula. The Germans claimed that they deliberately allowed the Russians to cross, then intending to engulf them. According to the Austro-Hungarians they arrived too late to prevent the crossings. In any event, the Russians were able to bring enough men quickly over the river to force the Austro-Hungarians to retreat to a line 60 km (37 mi), to the west. According to Max Hoffmann, the third ranking member of 9th Army Staff, they pulled back without alerting the nearby German units—they escaped only because they were warned by a German telephone operator. In fact the Austro-Hungarians did properly inform their allies

== Aftermath ==
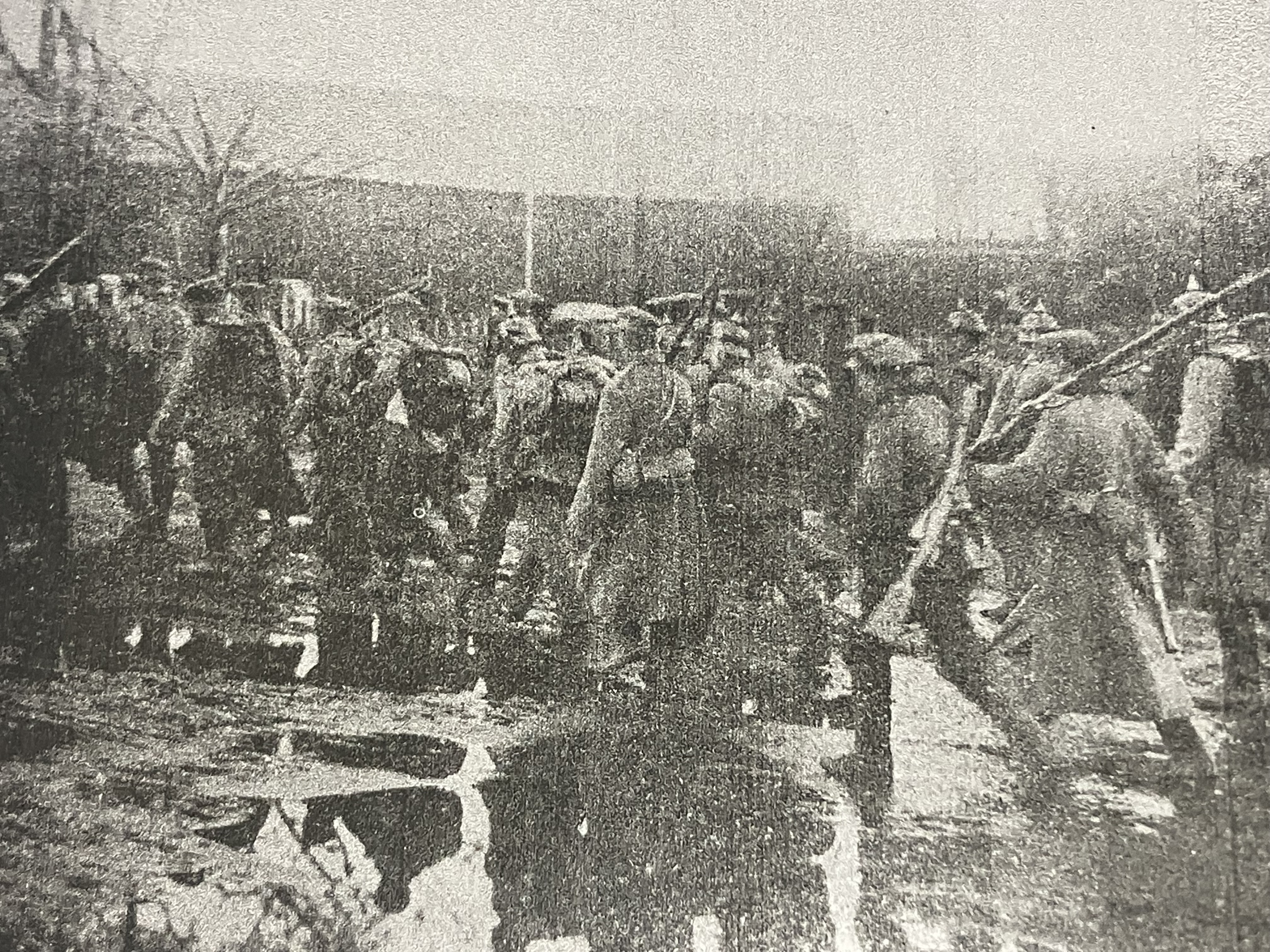
Captured German soldiers march in Warsaw, October 1914

According to Buttar, "Both the German and the Austro-Hungarian commanders attempted to emphasise that they had been forced to retreat because their allies had not delivered what was required. Despite taking an estimated 12,000 Russian prisoners, 1st Army had lost over 40,000 men, and had failed to eliminate any of the Russian bridgeheads across the Vistula." On 30 October, the Russians reached Łódź. The Russians took 19,000 prisoners and a lot of material trophies at the same time.

The Germans calculated that until extensive repairs were finished the furthest the Russians could advance over the devastated countryside was 120 km (75 mi), so they would have some weeks respite before the Russians could invade Silesia, but they had been forced back. They portrayed the withdrawal as a strategic maneuver, and had succeeded in blocking an enemy advance into Germany for weeks, while their army was trying to win on the Western Front. The retreat "... filled the Russian army with confidence in its strength to deal with Germany". Now Russian troops had beaten both Germans and the Austro-Hungarians. But they dissipated their advantage by indecision about their next move and confusion in their administrative arrangements

On 1 November, Hindenburg was given command of all of the German forces on the Eastern Front. Mackensen was promoted as commander of the 9th Army, the majority of which was deployed by rail to Thorn, so as to threaten the Russian northern flank. Yet, for the Austro-Hungarian forces, in the words of Buttar, "All the gains of the October campaign were to be abandoned, and a new line would be held through the winter, running along the Carpathians and then to Krakow."

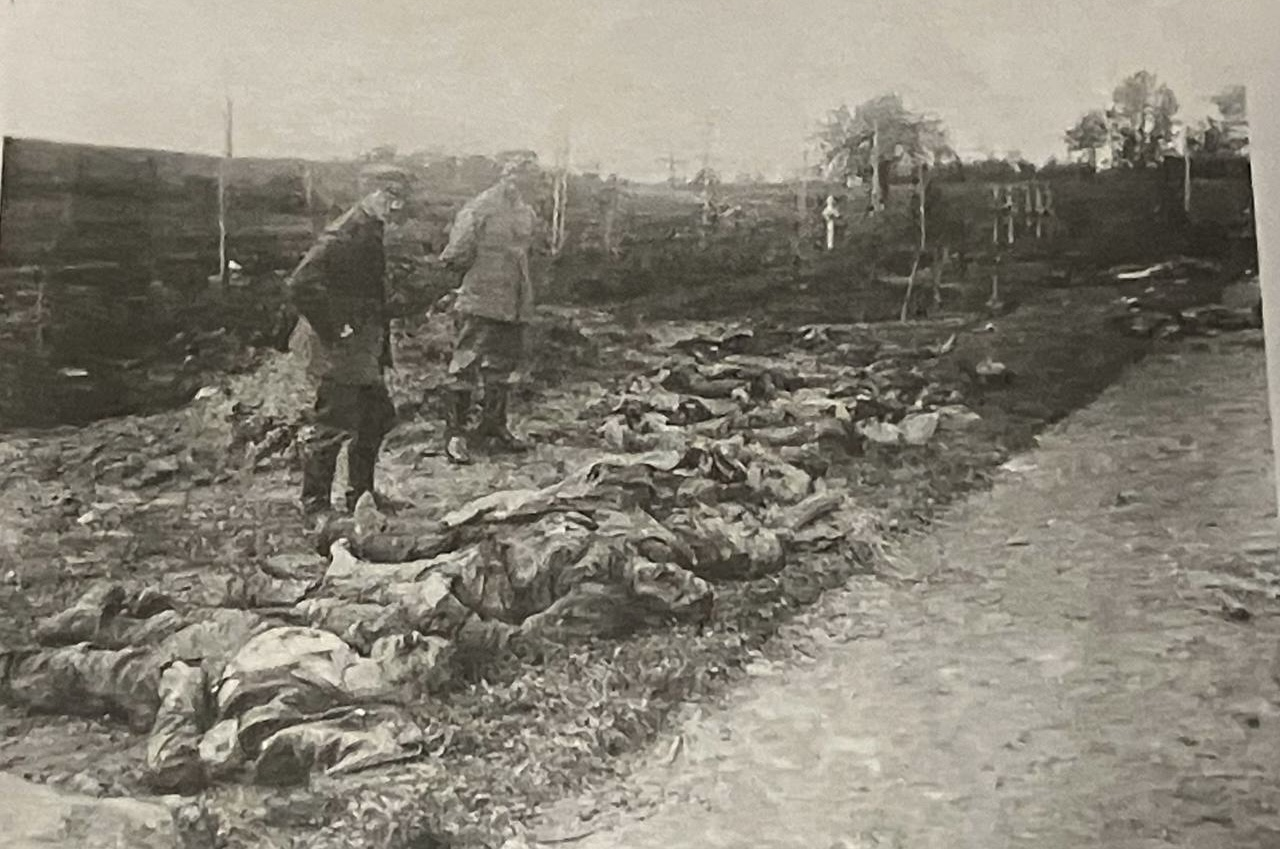
Identification of the dead German soldiers

Both sides suffered heavy losses, but because of the staffing levels, they were felt differently everywhere. Historian Alexei Oleynikov estimated the losses of both sides at 150,000, highlighting that the central powers lost 50% of the offensive group, and the Russians only 32%. Another Russian historian, Sergey Nelipovich, estimated the Russian losses at 150,000, but regularly changed the data on the losses of the central powers. His first estimate concluded that the German army had lost only 16,000 in battle. however, he later revised the positions on losses and raised them to 24,000 in total, according to his calculations, the central powers lost 79,000. The latest estimates were given by Maxim Oskin, he estimated the total losses of the central powers at 110,000, including 75,000 Austrians, the losses of the Russians were only slightly more.

== Order of battle on 1 October 1914 ==
=== Russian forces ===
Russian Northwestern Front (General of the Infantry Nikolai Ruzsky)

- Prinarevskaya (Narew) Group (Bobyrev)
  - 27th Army Corps (Warsaw Fortress)
    - 63rd Infantry Division
    - 77th Infantry Division
  - Novogeorgiyevsk Fortress garrison
    - 79th Infantry Division
    - one brigade of 2nd Infantry Division
  - Cavalry
    - 6th Cavalry Division
    - Caucasus Cavalry Division
    - Guards Cossack Brigade (Cossack Division "Kasnakov")
    - 1st Astrakhan Cossack Regiment
- 2nd Army (Sergei Sheydeman)
  - End of Sept. consisted of:
    - 1st Army Corps
      - 22nd Infantry Division
      - 24th Infantry Division
    - 23rd Army Corps
      - 3rd Guards Infantry Division
      - one brigade of 2nd Infantry Division
      - 1st Rifle Brigade
  - Later Reinforcements:
    - 2nd Army Corps (transferred Oct. 3 from 1st Army)
      - 26th Infantry Division
      - 43rd Infantry Division
    - 1st Siberian Army Corps (Arrived in Warsaw September 27 – October 1 from the interior)
      - 1st Siberian Rifle Division
      - 2nd Siberian Rifle Division
    - 2nd Siberian Army Corps (diverted to Warsaw from 10th Army; arrived Oct. 8)
      - 4th Siberian Rifle Division
      - 5th Siberian Rifle Division
    - 50th Infantry Division (Arrived in Warsaw on Oct. 10 from St. Petersburg)
    - 4th Army Corps (mid-Oct: Arrived in Warsaw from 1st Army)
      - 30th Infantry Division
      - 40th Infantry Division
    - 6th Siberian Army Corps (late Sept: the divisions arrived in the Warsaw area from the interior and initially operated independently; by mid-Oct they were controlled by 6th Siberian Army Corps staff.)
      - 13th Siberian Rifle Division
      - 14th Siberian Rifle Division
    - Cavalry Corps Novikov (see below; mid-Oct arrived in Warsaw)
- 4th Army (Aleksei Evert)
  - Grenadier Corps
    - 1st Grenadier Division
    - 2nd Grenadier Division
  - 3rd Caucasus Army Corps
    - 21st Infantry Division
    - 52nd Infantry Division
  - 16th Army Corps
    - 41st Infantry Division
    - 47th Infantry Division
  - Ivangorod Fortress garrison
    - 75th Infantry Division
    - 81st Infantry Division
  - Ural Cossack Division
  - Cavalry Corps Novikov (8 Oct: 8th Cavalry Division & Turkestan Cossack Brigade attached to 5th Army; rest of corps sent to Warsaw, arriving 14 Oct.)
    - 5th Cavalry Division
    - 8th Cavalry Division
    - 14th Cavalry Division
    - Turkestan Cossack Brigade
    - 4th Don Cossack Division
    - 5th Don Cossack Division
- 9th Army (Platon Lechitsky)
  - 1st Guards Corps
    - 1st Guards Infantry Division
    - 2nd Guards Infantry Division
    - Guards Rifle Brigade
  - 18th Army Corps
    - 23rd Infantry Division
    - 37th Infantry Division
  - 14th Army Corps
    - 18th Infantry Division
    - 45th Infantry Division
    - 2nd Rifle Brigade
  - 13th Cavalry Division
  - Guards Separate Cavalry Brigade (Carl Gustaf Emil Mannerheim)
- 5th Army (Paul von Plehwe)
  - 17th Army Corps
    - 3rd Infantry Division
    - 35th Infantry Division
  - 25th Army Corps
    - 3rd Grenadier Division
    - 46th Infantry Division
  - 5th Army Corps
    - 7th Infantry Division
    - 10th Infantry Divisions
  - 80th Infantry Division
  - 1st Don Cossack Division

=== Central Powers Forces ===
- German 9th Army (Field Marshal Paul von Hindenburg) (all units are German unless otherwise indicated)
  - Guards Reserve Corps
    - 3rd Guards Infantry Division
    - 1st Guards Reserve Division
  - XI Corps
    - 22nd Division
    - 38th Division
  - XVII Corps
    - 35th Division
    - 36th Division
  - XX Corps
    - 37th Division
    - 41st Division
    - reinforced with Austrian 3rd Cavalry Division in mid-October
  - Landwehr Corps "Woyrsch"
    - 3rd Landwehr Division
    - 4th Landwehr Division
  - Combined Corps "Frommel"
    - 8th Cavalry Division
    - 35th Reserve Division
    - Landwehr Division "Bredow"
    - 21st Landwehr Brigade
    - reinforced with Austrian 7th Cavalry Division in mid-October
  - Landsturm Brigades Rintelen, Hoffman and Westernhagen
- Austro-Hungarian 1st Army (General of the Cavalry Viktor Dankl von Krasnik) (all units are Austro-Hungarian)
  - I Army Corps
    - 5th Infantry Division
    - 12th Infantry Division
    - 46th Landwehr Infantry Division
    - 35th Austrian Landsturm Brigade
    - Polish Legion
  - V Army Corps
    - 14th Infantry Division
    - 33rd Infantry Division
    - 1st Austrian Landsturm Brigade (mid-Oct: Brigade transferred to 4th Army)
  - X Army Corps
    - 2nd Infantry Division
    - 24th Infantry Division
    - 45th Landwehr Infantry Division
  - Cavalry Corps "Korda"
    - 3rd Cavalry Division (mid-Oct: division transferred to German 9th Army)
    - 7th Cavalry Division (mid-Oct: division transferred to 9th Army)
  - 37th Honvéd Infantry Division
  - 106th Austrian Landsturm Division
  - 100th, 101st & 110th Hungarian Landsturm Brigades (mid-Oct: 110th Landsturm Brigade transferred to 4th Army)
  - Reinforcements:
    - Early Oct: 43rd Landwehr Infantry Division
    - Cavalry Corps "Hauer"
      - 2nd Cavalry Division
      - 9th Cavalry Division
    - 23 October: 11th Cavalry Division

== Bibliography ==
- Khavkin, Boris (2018). Gerhard Gross (ed.). The forgotten front. The Eastern Theater of World War I, 1914-1915. Kentucky University Press. ISBN 0-8131-7544-5.
- Gilbert, Martin (2023). The First World War: A complete History. Moscow: Квадрига. ISBN 978-5-389-08465-0.
- Bichanina, Zinaida (2018). Первая мировая война. Большой иллюстрированный атлас [The First World War: Great illustrated atlas]. Litres. ISBN 978-5-17-084566-8.
- Nelipovich, Sergei (2017). Русский фронт Первой Мировой войны: потери сторон 1914 [The Russian Front of the First World War: the losses of the sides in 1914]. Moscow: Квадрига. ISBN 978-5-91791-238-7.
- Oleynikov, Alexei (2016). Россия-щит Антанты [Russia-Shield of Entente]. Foreword by Nikolai Starikov. St.Petersburg: Piter. ISBN 978-5-496-01795-4.
- Tucker, Spencer The Great War: 1914–18 (1998)
- Glaise-Horstenau, Edmund Österreich-Ungarns letzter Krieg 1914-1918. Erster Band. Das Kriegsjahr 1914 (1931)
- Bleibtreu, Karl Bismarck, Band 3
- Zapolowski, Wladimir, Zapolovskyi, Mykola (2021). Der Bewegungskrieg an der mittleren Weichsel von Oktober bis Anfang November 1914. Pallasch : Zeitschrift für Militärgeschichte : Organ der Österreichischen Gesellschaft für Herreskunde. Vol. 76, pp. 113-125. ISBN 978-3-902721-76-1
- Oskin, Maxim (2024). Осень 1914: схватка за Польшу [Autumn 1914: the Battle for Poland] (in Russian). Военно-историческая библиотека. Moscow: Вече. ISBN 978-5-4484-4924-6.
- Nelipovich, Sergei G. (2020). Варшавско-Ивангородская операция 1914 года [Warsaw-Ivangorod operation, 1914]. Забытые войны России (Russia's Forgotten Wars) (in Russian). Российская ассоциация историков Первой мировой войны (Russian Association of Historians of the First World War). Moscow: Квадрига. ISBN 978-5-91791-381-0.
