= Battle of Łódź (1914) =

Part of the First World War

Coordinates: 51°46′37″N 19°27′17″E

- Part of the Eastern Front during World War I
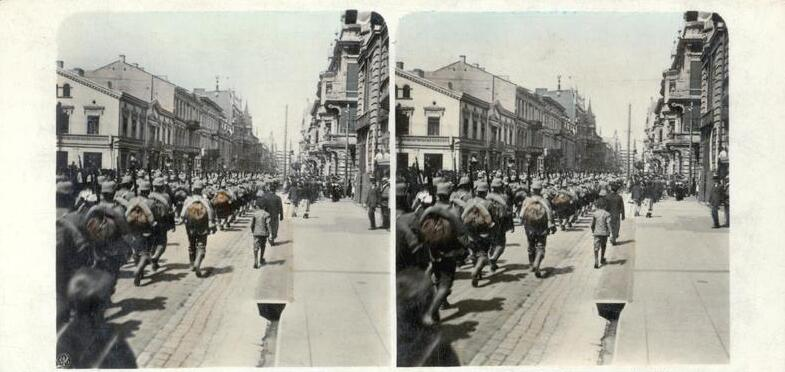
- German soldiers enter Łódź on 6 December 1914
| Date | 11 November – 6 December 1914 (3 weeks and 4 days) |
| Location | Łódź, Congress Poland, Russian Empire |
| Result | See § Aftermath Brief results: German plan of encirclement and destruction failed; Planned Russian invasion of Silesia failed |

Belligerents
| German Empire; Austria-Hungary | Russian Empire: Congress Poland |

Commanders and leaders
| (German Empire) Paul von Hindenburg (German Empire) Erich Ludendorff (German Empire) August von Mackensen (German Empire) Karl Litzmann (German Empire) Alfred Bizen † (German Empire) Winkler von Dankenschweil † (German Empire) Otto von Henning † | Nikolai Ruzsky; Paul von Rennenkampf; Sergei Sheydeman; Paul von Plehwe; Samad bey Mehmandarov |

Units involved
| (German Empire) 9th Army (German Empire) 8th Army (Note: Only the 1st and 25th Corps took part in the battle) (Austria-Hungary) 1st Army | Northwestern Front: 1st Army; 2nd Army; 5th Army |

Strength
| 180,000 | 367,000 combat troops 1,305–1,311 guns 740 machine guns |

Casualties and losses
| Official German medical reports 25,818 KIA, 76,451 WIA, 22,360 MIA; Total 122,055 | Official Russian medical reports 25,544 KIA, 117,882 WIA, 172,735 MIA; Total 313,283 |

The Battle of Łódź (German: Schlacht um Łódź) or Lodz operation (Russian: Лодзинская операция, romanized: Lodzinskaya operatsia) took place from 11 November to 6 December 1914, near the city of Łódź in Poland. Battles were fought between German units of the 8th Army, 9th Army, Austrian 1st Army, and the Russian 1st, 2nd, and 5th Armies, in harsh winter conditions. The Germans redeployed their 9th Army around Thorn, so as to threaten the Russian northern flank, following German reversals after the Battle of the Vistula River. The German objective was to prevent an invasion of Germany, by encircling and destroying the Russians; instead, the Germans were surrounded and lost two corps; still, the invasion of Germany was prevented. The battle had a strong impact on both the Western and Eastern fronts. It ended with the tactical victory of the Russian troops, although the Russians eventually withdrew and the pressure on the Austrians eased, as reinforcements that could have gone to Przemyśl went instead to Łódź; implying a strategic victory for Germany.

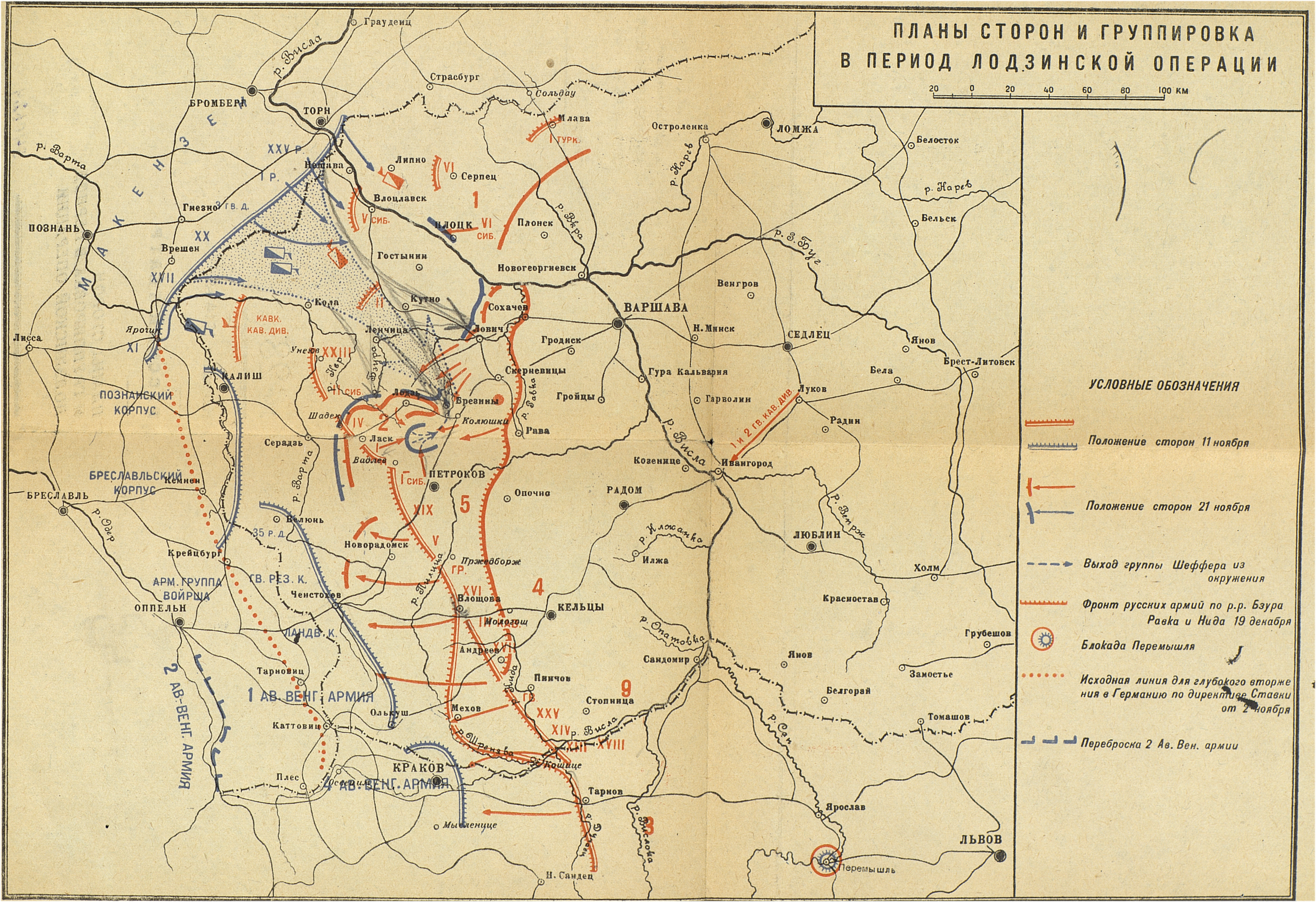
Russian map of the Lodz operation

== Background ==
Grand Duke Nicholas Nikolayevich favored Nikolai Ruzsky's plan to invade Silesia on 14 November, with the Russian 2nd, 5th, and 4th Armies. The Russian 10th and 1st Armies maintained pressure on East Prussia, while the 8th Army pressed against the Carpathian passes, the Eleventh besieged Przemyśl, and the 3rd Army advanced on Kraków. Hindenburg and Ludendorff had moved the German 9th Army to the Thorn area, in an attempt to defend Silesia. The 9th Army consisted of the XI, XVII, and XX Corps, plus the 3rd Guards Infantry Division, and the I Reserve and XXV Reserve Corps from the 8th Army. Four divisions of the Austro-Hungarian 2nd Army took over the German 9th Army's former positions, the remainder of 2nd Army troops then came under the command of the Austro-Hungarian 3rd Army. The Germans had placed 15 infantry divisions, and 5 cavalry divisions, under Mackensen's 9th Army in its drive on Łódź. However, the German advance faced 24 Russian infantry divisions and 8 cavalry divisions. The Scheidemann's Russian 2nd Army was deployed around Łódź, with his 4th, 1st and 23rd Army Corps on the Warta, and his 2nd Army Corps at Łęczyca. Rennenkampf's Russian 1st Army was deployed further east, along the Vistula.

On 1 November, Paul von Hindenburg was appointed commander of the two German armies on the Eastern Front. His 8th Army was defending East Prussia. Knowing Silesia would be invaded on 14 November, Hindenburg and Ludendorff decided not to meet the attack head-on, but to seize the initiative by shifting their 9th Army north by railway to the border south of the German fortress at Thorn, where they were reinforced with two corps transferred from 8th Army. The enlarged 9th Army would then attack the Russian right flank, cutting Łódź off from Warsaw, and eliminating any troops thus encircled. In ten days 9th Army was moved north by running 80 trains every day.

== Battle ==
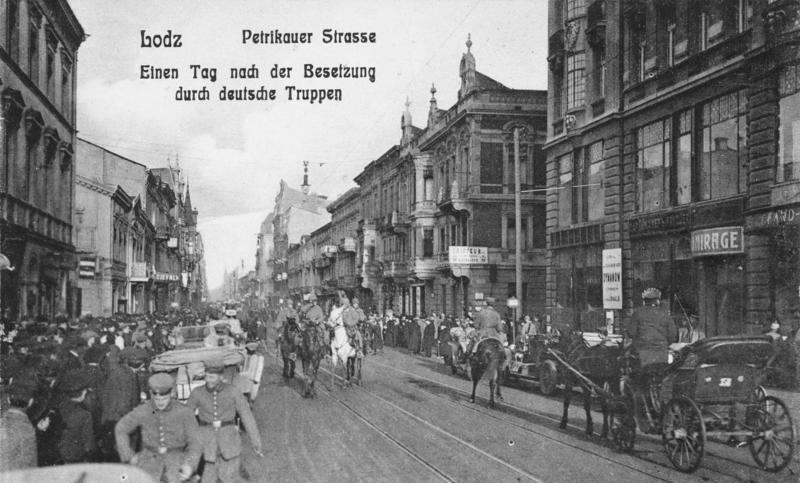
German soldiers in Łódź, December 1914.

On 11 November, Mackensen's German 9th Army I and XXV Reserve Corps struck at the 5th Siberian Army Corps of Rennenkampf's 1st Army, located near Włocławek on the left bank of the Vistula, before they could prepare defensive positions. The German XX Corps advanced on Lubraniec so as to attack the 5th Siberian Army Corps flank. Rennenkampf was refused permission to send his 6th Siberian Army Corps from Wyszogród to the aid of the 5th Siberian Army Corps, who had to retreat. On 12 November, a gap formed between the Russian 2nd and 5th Siberian Army Corps, as the 5th Siberian Army Corps was forced to retreat to the southeast, which Mackensen took advantage of on 13 November. On 14 November, Mackensen ordered his entire German 9th Army to advance, with his XI Corps attacking the Russian 23rd Army Corps northern flank, his XVII and XX Corps engaging the Russian 2nd Army Corps, and his I Reserve Corps was to capture Łowicz, while containing the 6th Siberian Army Corps. Yet, the Russians were still unaware of the German force attacking them, as they started their invasion of Silesia. On 15 November, the Germans captured Kutno, and on 16 November, crossed the Bzura, while Scheidemann ordered his Russian 1st and 4th Army Corps to retreat towards Łódź. As the German XX Corps captured Stryków, the XXV Reserve Corps captured Brzeziny on 18 November, while XX and XVII engaged the defenses of Łódź. The Russian 5th Army's 19th and 5th Army Corps were ordered north to Skierniewice, in support of 2nd Army's left flank. It was Plehve's Russian 5th Army which prevented German encirclement of Łódź from the south. In the interim, Rennenkampf's Russian 1st Army remained stationary, content to guard the approach to Warsaw.

Grand Duke Nicholas's primary objective was saving 2nd Army and avoiding a repeat of the disaster at Tannenberg. On 16 November he ordered Wenzel von Plehve's Russian 5th Army to abandon the proposed offensive into Silesia and to move northward towards Łódź; they marched 116 km (72 mi) in only two days. As soon as Hindenburg saw the transcript of this order, he knew that his maneuver had succeeded. Now seven Russian corps were defending the city. Plehve smashed into Mackensen's right flank on 18 November in bitter winter conditions (at times the temperature dropped as low as 10 °F (−12 °C).

By 19 November, the Germans were facing a numerically superior Russian force, with the intention of the Russians to attack the German penetration east of Łódź on 21 November. Yet, Mackensen still ordered his XX and XXV Reserve Corps to continue their effort to outflank the Russian Łódź defenses. The Germans made little progress on 20 November. On 21 November, a group commanded by Vladimir Slyusarenko in Rennenkampf's Russian 1st Army, advanced from Łowicz towards Bielawy and Strykow, in an attempt to close the 30 miles (48 km) gap between the Russian 1st and 2nd Armies. Slyusarenko's force consisted of the 43rd Infantry Division, the 6th Siberian Infantry Division, and 3 additional brigades. Only the German 19th Dragoon Regiment opposed this Russian threat to Friedrich von Scholtz's XX Corps rear, whose front faced southwest, south, and east.

The German 9th Army's right wing was XXV Reserve Corps, commanded by Lieutenant General Reinhard von Scheffer-Boyadel, a 63-year-old who had been recalled from retirement. With Lieutenant General Manfred von Richthofen's, great uncle of the flying ace, cavalry in the vanguard, they were pushing southeast between Łódź and the Vistula. Part of Rennenkampf's 1st Army was finally moving east to attack the Germans. Their repositioning was hindered when a makeshift bridge across the river collapsed, so they had to cross by ferry or on the nearest usable crossing 85 km (53 mi) upstream. Once over they attacked the weakly defended side of the corridor extending south from the German frontier to their advancing spearhead. The Russians reoccupied Brzeziny, cutting the roads used by German XXV Reserve Corps, whose progress south was now blocked by the Russian 5th Army. Scheffer was ordered to stop advancing, but the order did not reach him. Suddenly it was the Germans who were ensnared in a pocket. Mackensen stopped attacking toward Łódź, turning to help to extricate them. The ecstatic Russians ordered trains for up to 20,000 prisoners, actually the German fighting strength in the pocket was about 11,000, but there were also 3,000 wounded. Other sources state that 50,000 prisoners were anticipated.

Hindenburg was alarmed by the intercepted wireless messages ordering the trains, but Mackensen assured him that they would prevail. In the pocket, Richthofen's cavalry, which had been leading the advance, reversed direction to screen the rear of three infantry columns Scheffer formed along the roads for the retreat back northwest. The frozen, hungry Germans pushed on through the icy night. They reached the outskirts of Breziny unobserved, because most of the 6th Siberian Division were huddling in their sleeping quarters, trying to keep from freezing. The Germans attacked at dawn with bayonets on unloaded rifles and occupied much of the town before a shot was fired. The commander of 6th Siberian Division, Gennings, broke down. Swamped with conflicting accounts of German movements, and with the weather too foggy and the days too short for aerial observation, Ruzsky issued a series of orders, each contradicting the one before.

Scheffer's left column, led by Karl Litzmann's 3rd Guards Infantry Division, had reached Breziny on the morning of 24 November. Litzmann wrote, on the retreat through Gałków Mały beforehand, "...the sleeping Russians were hauled out of the houses and taken prisoner." Litzmann led the "overwhelming and sudden" attack on Breziny, of which, "The success reinvigorated us," he later wrote. According to Buttar, "The confusion in command was widespread throughout the Russian formations involved in the fighting. It seems that the moves by Mackensen to aid the breakout by directing elements of XX Corps and I Reserve Corps to attack the encircling Russians distracted many local commanders, who directed their troops into positions from where they could cover any new German advance from the north, rather than a breakout from the encirclement." Scheffer's central column was led by Thiesenhausen's 49th Reserve Division messaged Scheffer, "There is no doubt: if we don't get through today, we will all be left lying on this ground, or will be en route for Siberia." By the end of the day, all three of Scheffer's columns were united in Brzeziny, including the right column consisting of Hans von der Goltz's 50th Reserve Division. In the words of Buttar, "It was the end of the encirclement of Scheffer's command."

Scheffer's XXV Reserve Corps was able to link up with the German XX Corps, when the Alexei Churin's Russian 2nd Army Corps abandoned Strykow. Scheffer's men had escaped with their wounded, 12,000 Russian prisoners, and 64 captured Russian guns.

Inconclusive fighting continued until 29 November when at a conference with his front commanders Grand Duke Nicholas ordered his forces in Poland to withdraw to defensible lines nearer to Warsaw. Hindenburg learned from an intercepted wireless that Łódź was to be evacuated.

=== Casualties ===
The battle became one of the bloodiest on the eastern front, the Russian troops won, but paid a heavy price. The most minimal estimates of losses of Russian troops start from 110,000. Russian authors Alexei Oleynikov and Sergey Nelipovich, however, raise Russian losses to about 300,000. The former estimate Russian losses at 280,000, which made up the majority of the grouping. The second one brings the bar to 316,478 total losses, of which 25,000 were killed, 116,000 were injured, and 172,000 were missing. The losses of the central Powers are estimated in approximately the same range. Nelipovich shows that of the 9th Army, losses amounted to 124,629, of which 25,000 also died. Oleynikov estimates the losses of the 9th Army in the same way, but adds that according to the report to the German headquarters near Lodz, over 36,000 people were only buried, and in addition to the troops of the 9th Army, other units suffered heavy losses, as a result, he brings the total losses to 160,000.

== Aftermath ==
Mackensen, Scheffer and Litzmann were awarded the Pour le Mérite, while Litzmann earned the nickname 'the Lion of Brzeziny'. According to Buttar, "The encirclement of XXV Reserve Corps was broken for several reasons: lack of coordination by 1st, 2nd, and 5th Armies; the extraordinary muddle of command in the Lowicz detachment; and Ruzsky's oscillation between his deep-rooted caution and his almost impulsive issuing of orders for all-out attacks." For the Russian Army, Łódź became the furthest point of advance towards Germany's heartland. Ruzsky retreated to a defensive line along the Bzura and Rawka rivers.

The Russians were able to avoid a full cauldron in a semi-circle and repel all attacks of their enemy, thereby avoiding a new Tannenberg. This meant that the Germans' encirclement plans were thwarted and the battle ended in a tactical victory for the Russians. The Germans themselves, e.g., Max Hoffmann and Ludendorff, admitted that the battle was not successful for them in terms of achieving operational and tactical objectives.

Hindenburg summed it up: "In its rapid changes from attack to defense, enveloping to being enveloped, breaking through to being broken through, this struggle reveals a most confusing picture on both sides. A picture which in its mounting ferocity exceeded all the battles that had previously been fought on the Eastern front!" The Polish winter bought a lull to the major fighting. A Russian invasion of Silesia must wait for spring. By this time, the Russians feared the German army, which seemed to appear from nowhere and to win a strategic victory despite substantial odds against them, while the Germans regarded the Russian army with "increasing disdain." The strategic victory of the Germans was that they achieved the goal of helping the besieged Austrians from a Russian attack and preventing any Russian attack on Central Germany; the Russians withdrew and never again to come so close to German soil. Hindenburg and Ludendorff were convinced that if sufficient troops were transferred from the Western Front, they could force the Russians out of the war.

If the East Prussian operation is a vivid example of a brilliant tactical victory and a strategic unsuccess for the Germans (as they moved from the west the needed troops in the form of 2 corps and 1 cavalry division that could be useful at the First Battle of the Marne (Note: See Russian invasion of East Prussia (1914) § Battle)), then the opposite is true with the Łódź operation. Technically, Łódź was a victory for Russia, (Note: The Germans were unable to break through the defenses of the Russian troops, means a Russian tactical victory.) (Note: "Moreover, Hindenburg sent a telegram to Wilhelm 2 on November 27, in which he blamed Falkenhayn for the failure of the Lodz operation") (Note: "Behind all these events, it was forgotten that the winners of the operation were still the Russians, who managed to fend off and disrupt all German attacking planning".) but the Germans achieved their aim, and after the Russian withdrawal, Russia never came so close to German soil.

== Order of Battle ==
=== Central Powers Forces ===
[North to South]

- 9th Army [as of Nov. 11, 1914] – Gen. August von Mackensen
  - Corps "Thorn" – Gen. Gustaf von Dickhuth-Harrach
    - 99th Reserve Infantry Brigade (from 50th Reserve Infantry Division)
    - 21st Landwehr Infantry Brigade
    - Brigade "Westernhagen" (Landwehr & Landsturm)
  - XXV Reserve Corps
    - 49th Reserve Infantry Division
    - 100th Reserve Infantry Brigade (from 50th Reserve Infantry Division)
  - I Reserve Corps
    - 1st Reserve Infantry Division
    - 36th Reserve Infantry Division
  - HKK 1 – Gen. Manfred von Richthofen
    - 6th Cavalry Division
    - 9th Cavalry Division
  - XX Corps
    - 37th Infantry Division
    - 41st Infantry Division
  - XVII Corps
    - 35th Infantry Division
    - 36th Infantry Division
  - XI Corps
    - 22nd Infantry Division
    - 38th Infantry Division
  - HKK 3 – Gen. Rudolf Ritter von Frommel
    - 5th Cavalry Division
    - 8th Cavalry Division
    - Austrian 7th Cavalry Division
  - Landsturm Brigade "Doussin" (part of Corps "Posen")
  - In reserve: 3rd Guards Infantry Division
- Reinforcements:
- Arrived starting mid-November:
  - Approximately 5 towed foot artillery battalions with 10 batteries of 21 cm heavy howitzers plus 1 Austro-Hungarian 30.5 cm siege howitzer battery (from the eastern fortresses and the west)
- Mid-November:
  - Corps "Posen" (four weak brigades composed of Landwehr, Ersatz and Landsturm troops) – Gen. Fritz Wilhelm von Hernhaußen
- End of November:
  - II Corps (from the west)
    - 3rd Infantry Division (later one brigade transferred to Corps "Gerok")
    - 4th Infantry Division
  - Corps "Gerok"
    - 48th Reserve Infantry Division (from the west)
  - Corps "Breslau" (later added to Corps "Gerok")
    - Division "Menges"
    - Brigade "Schmiedecke"
  - 1st Infantry Division (from I Corps of 8th Army in East Prussia)
  - 4th Cavalry Division (from southern part of the East Prussian front)
- Beginning of December:
  - Corps "Fabek" (from the west)
    - 26th Infantry Division
    - 25th Reserve Infantry Division
  - III Reserve Corps (from the west)
    - 5th Reserve Infantry Division
    - 6th Reserve Infantry Division
- Mid-December:
  - 1st Guard Reserve Infantry Division (from Army "Woyrsch")

=== Russian Forces ===
Northwestern Front – Gen. Ruzsky

- 1st Army – Gen. Paul von Rennenkampf (from 2 Dec. Gen. Alexander Litvinov)
  - 1st Turkestan Army Corps
    - 11th Siberian Rifle Division
    - 1st Turkestan Rifle Brigade
    - 2nd Turkestan Rifle Brigade
  - 5th Siberian Army Corps
    - 50th Infantry Division
    - 79th Infantry Division
  - 6th Army Corps
    - 4th Infantry Division
    - 16th Infantry Division
  - 6th Siberian Army Corps
    - 13th Siberian Rifle Division
    - 14th Siberian Rifle Division
  - Combined Cossack Division
  - Guard Cossack Division
  - 4th Don Cossack Division
  - 6th Cavalry Division
  - Ussuri Mounted Brigade
  - Reinforcements:
    - 2nd Army Corps (from 2nd Army)
    - 6th Siberian Rifle Division (from 10th Army)
    - 55th Infantry Division (from army reserve)
    - 67th Infantry Division (from army reserve)
    - 63rd Reserve Division (half) (from Warsaw fortified area)
    - 3rd Turkestan Rifle Brigade
    - Rifle Officers’ School Regiment (from Warsaw fortified area)
- 2nd Army – Gen. Sergei Scheidemann
  - 1st Army Corps
    - 22nd Infantry Division
    - 24th Infantry Division
  - 2nd Army Corps
    - 26th Infantry Division
    - 43rd Infantry Division
  - 2nd Siberian Army Corps
    - 4th Siberian Rifle Division
    - 5th Siberian Rifle Division
  - 4th Army Corps
    - 30th Infantry Division
    - 40th Infantry Division
  - 23rd Army Corps
    - 3rd Guard Infantry Division
    - 1st Rifle Brigade
    - one brigade of 2nd Infantry Division
  - Cavalry Corps "Novikov"
    - 5th Cavalry Division
    - 8th Cavalry Division
    - 14th Cavalry Division
  - Caucasus Cavalry Division
  - Reinforcements in Dec:
    - 2nd Cavalry Division (from 10th Army)
    - 62nd Reserve Division (from army reserve)
- 5th Army – Gen. Pavel Plehve
  - 1st Siberian Army Corps
    - 1st Siberian Rifle Division
    - 2nd Siberian Rifle Division
  - 5th Army Corps
    - 5th Infantry Division
    - 10th Infantry Division
  - 19th Army Corps
    - 17th Infantry Division
    - 38th Infantry Division
  - 5th Don Cossack Division
  - Turkmen Cossack Brigade

== Bibliography ==
- Miltatuli, Pyotr (2017). Россия в эпоху царствование Николая 2 [Russia in the reign of Nicholas 2] (in Russian). Volume 2. Moscow: Русский издательский центр имени святого Василия Великого.
- Golovin, Nikolai (2014). Россия в Первой мировой войне [Russia in First World War]. Вече. ISBN 978-5-4444-1667-9.
- Bichanina, Zinaida (2018). Первая мировая война. Большой иллюстрированный атлас [The First World War: Great illustrated atlas]. Litres. ISBN 978-5-17-084566-8.
- Tucker, Spencer The Great War: 1914–18 (1998)
- Wulffen, Karl von, and P. B. Harm. The Battle of Lodz. Washington, D.C.: s.n., 1932. OCLC 36175892
- Nelipovich, Sergei (2021). Лодзинская кампания 1914 года [Lodz campaign 1914]. Moscow: Квадрига. ISBN 978-5-91791-387-2.
- Oleynikov, Alexei (2016). Россия-щит Антанты [Russia-Shield of Entente]. Foreword by Nikolai Starikov. St.Petersburg: Piter. ISBN 978-5-496-01795-4.
- Zayonchkovski, Andrey (2002) [1929]. Первая Мировая Война [The First World War] (in Russian). St.Petersburg: Poligon. ISBN 5-89173-174-6.
- Nelipovich, Sergei (2017). Русский фронт Первой Мировой войны: потери сторон 1914 [The Russian Front of the First World War: the losses of the sides in 1914]. Moscow: Квадрига. ISBN 978-5-91791-238-7.
- Oskin, Maxim (2024). Осень 1914: схватка за Польшу [Autumn 1914: the Battle for Poland] (in Russian). Военно-историческая библиотека. Moscow: Вече. ISBN 978-5-4484-4924-6.
