= Battle of Tannenberg =

1914 World War I battle

- Part of the East Prussian campaign of the Eastern Front in World War I
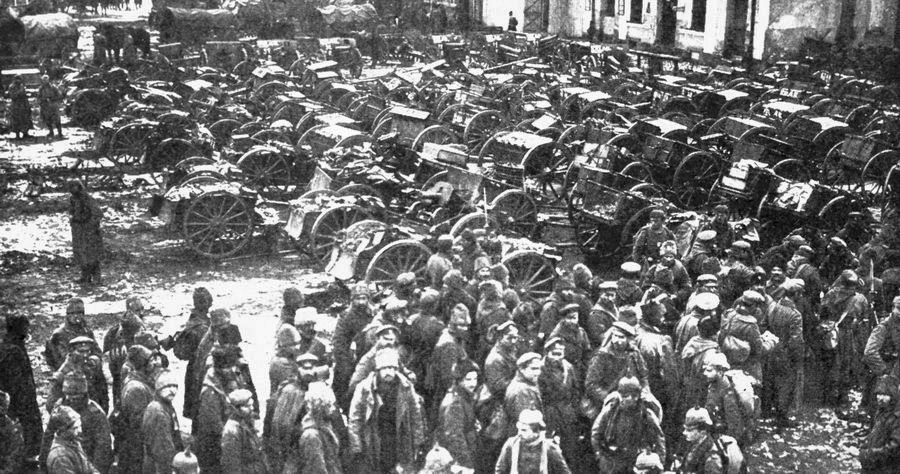
- Russian prisoners of war after the battle
Date	26–30 August 1914
Location	Allenstein, East Prussia, German Empire (present-day Poland) 53°45′N 20°30′E
Result	German victory

Belligerents
German Empire	Russian Empire

Commanders and leaders
(German Empire) Maximilian von Prittwitz (German Empire) Paul von Hindenburg (German Empire) Erich Ludendorff (German Empire) Max Hoffmann (German Empire) Hermann von François	(Russian Empire) Alexander Samsonov † (Russian Empire) Yakov Zhilinsky (Note: Commander of the Northwestern Front. (Note: § Armies deployed on the Northwestern Front) Not actually involved in the battle.)

Units involved
(German Empire) 8th Army	(Russian Empire) 2nd Army

Strength
150,000; 294 machine guns 728 guns and howitzers	123,000–180,000; 384 machine guns 612 guns and howitzers

Casualties and losses
21–30 August: 13,873+: • 1,726+ killed; • 7,461 wounded; • 4,686 missing; Other estimate: about 30,000 dead and wounded (Note: or "fewer than 20,000 casualties")	70,000–120,219 killed, wounded or captured See § Casualties

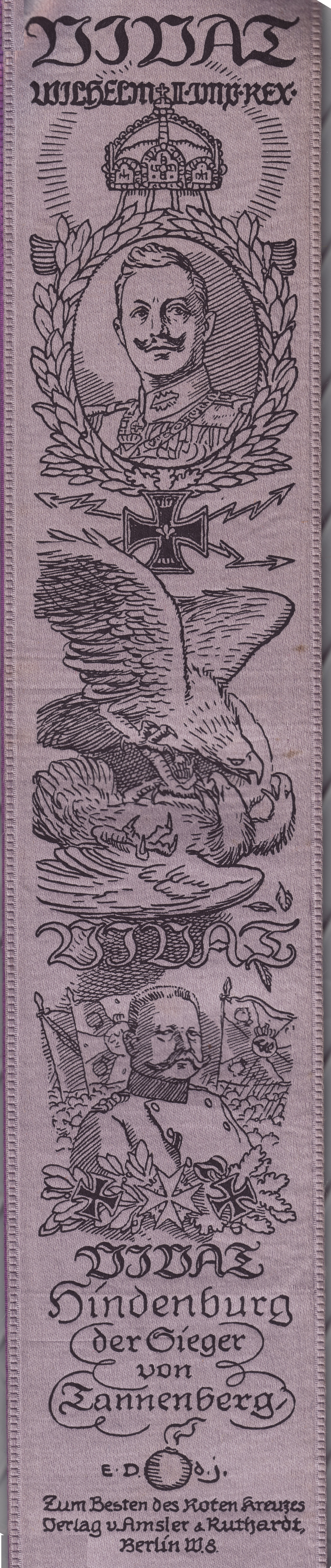
Vivat ribbon commemorating the Battle of Tannenberg, showing Wilhelm II and "Hindenburg the victor of Tannenberg"

The Battle of Tannenberg, also known as the Second Battle of Tannenberg, (Note: In Russian historiography, it is also called the Samsonov operation or Hindenburg's operation.) was fought between Russia and Germany between 26 and 30 August 1914, the first month of World War I. The battle resulted in the encirclement and the almost complete destruction of the Russian 2nd Army by the German 8th Army and the suicide of its commanding general, Alexander Samsonov. A series of follow-up battles (First Masurian Lakes) led to the ousting of the Russian 1st Army from East Prussia.

The outcome brought considerable prestige to the German army commander, General Paul von Hindenburg, and his rising staff officer, General Erich Ludendorff. Although the battle actually took place near Allenstein (Olsztyn), Hindenburg named it after Tannenberg, 30 km (19 mi) to the west, in order to avenge the Teutonic Knights' defeat at the Battle of Grunwald 500 years earlier.

The East Prussian campaign is particularly notable for fast rail movements by the German 8th Army, enabling them to concentrate against each of the two Russian armies in turn, first delaying the 1st Army and then destroying the 2nd before once again turning on the 1st days later. It is also notable for the failure of the Russians to encode their radio messages, broadcasting their daily marching orders in the clear, which allowed the Germans to make their movements with the confidence they would not be flanked. After the battles of Stallupönen and Gumbinnen, the German army was forced to retreat by the 1st Army. Yakov Zhilinsky, the leader of the Russian Northwestern Front, of which the 2nd and 1st Armies were a part, based on a report from the 1st Army, drew a non-existent picture for Samsonov about the German withdrawal, partly to the Vistula, partly to Königsberg, without any knowledge of the order in which they were withdrawing or where they were located. Samsonov's Russians, in turn, uncertain of the German army's exact location, acted as if counting "on a miracle" during their offensive.

In the course of the Russian offensive into East Prussia, there was no agreement between Samsonov and Zhilinsky, concerning the direction in which the 2nd Army would engage in battle; Samsonov moved to the northwest ("Allenstein – Osterode") and intended to continue, but Zhilinsky intended to strike north ("Seeburg – Allenstein"). This disorganized leadership, present in the senior command staff, contributed to the disastrous defeat as well. In the end of disputes about the army's movement, Zhilinsky chose to find the golden mean, – he gave in to Samsonov, on the condition that the latter agreed to detach only the 6th Army Corps to Bischofsburg, in the direction that Zhilinsky intended. This corps escaped encirclement, though it was also defeated separately. Zhilinsky did not give Samsonov any specific orders at Tannenberg; the latter actually acted independently and this already put pressure on the psyche of Samsonov. In addition to the previous, the Imperial Russian Army began the war without a sufficiently trained officer corps, with a small reserve for new formations and for the training of conscripts, with a sharp, compared to the Germans, shortage of artillery, very poorly supplied with all technical means and ammunition, having in its rear a country and its military administration unprepared for waging a major war and an industry completely unprepared for the transition to work for military needs. Moreover, the Russians also had problems supplying their armies due to bad local infrastructure and the fact that they deployed very significant horsepower (cavalry), which required larger food supplies that were already critical.

== Background ==
Germany entered World War I largely following the Schlieffen Plan. According to Prit Buttar, "In combination with his own strong desire to fight an offensive war featuring outflanking and encircling movements, Schlieffen went on to develop his plan for a sweeping advance through Belgium. In the east, limited German forces would defend against any Russian attack until more forces became available from the west, fresh from victory over the French. The total strength of the fully mobilised German Army in 1914 amounted to 1,191 battalions, the great majority of which would be deployed against France. The 8th Army in East Prussia would go to war with barely 10 per cent of this total."

The Russian Forces were less prepared than they would have otherwise been, thanks to an overestimation of the Russian military and a general who was having real problems on Russia's other fronts. General Yakov Grigoryevich Zhilinsky was in charge of this attack and had pledged to put 800,000 men on the front by the 15th day of mobilization. Due to the rushed nature of this attack, the Russian operation developed numerous cracks and failures as a result of poor communication between the front and command. This lack of communication resulted in orders that would contradict the previous ones and headquarters giving soldiers orders in a hurry. All of this confusion and disorganization severely hampered the general's efforts and progress on the Russian Front stalled.

The French Army's Plan XVII at the outbreak of the war involved swift mobilization followed by an immediate attack to drive the Germans from Alsace and Lorraine. If the British Expeditionary Force (BEF) joined in accordance with their Allied treaty, they would fill the left flank. Their Russian allies in the East would have a massive army, more than 95 divisions, but their mobilization would inevitably be slower. Getting their men to the front would itself take time because of their relatively sparse and unreliable railway network (for example, 75% of Russian railways were still single-tracked). Russia intended to have 27 divisions at the front by day 15 of hostilities and 52 by day 23, but it would take 60 days before 90 divisions were in action. Despite their difficulties, the Russians promised the French that they would promptly engage the armies of Austria-Hungary in the south and on day 15 would invade German East Prussia.

According to Prit Buttar, "In addition to the fortifications amongst the Masurian Lake District, the Germans had built a series of major forts around Königsberg in the 19th century and had then modernised them over the years. Similarly, major fortresses had been established along the Vistula, particularly at Thorn (now Toruń). Combined with the flexibility provided by the German railways, allowing General Maximilian von Prittwitz to concentrate against the inner flanks of either Russian invasion force, the Germans could realistically view the coming war with a degree of confidence."

The Russians would rely on two of their three railways that ran up to the border; each would provision an army. The railways ended at the border, as Russian trains operated on a different rail gauge from Western Europe. Consequently, its armies could be transported by rail only as far as the German border and could use Prussian railways only with captured locomotives and rolling stock. The 1st Army would use the line that ran from Vilnius, Lithuania, to the border 136 km (85 mi) southeast of Königsberg. The 2nd Army railway ran from Warsaw, Poland, to the border 165 km (103 mi) southwest of Königsberg. The two armies would take the Germans in a pincer. The Russian supply chains would be ungainly because—for defense—on their side of the border there were only a few sandy tracks rather than proper macadamized roads. Adding to their supply problems, the Russians deployed large numbers of cavalry and Cossacks; every day each horse needed ten times the resources that a man required.

The 1st Army commander was Paul von Rennenkampf, who in the Russo-Japanese War had earned a reputation for "exceptional energy, determination, courage, and military capability". The 1st Army was mobilized from the Vilno Military District, and consisted of four infantry corps, five cavalry divisions and an independent cavalry brigade. The 2nd Army, commanded by Alexander Vasilyevich Samsonov, was mobilized from the Warsaw Military District, and consisted of five infantry corps and four cavalry divisions. These two armies formed the Northwestern Front facing the Germans, under the command of Yakov Zhilinsky. The Southwestern Front, facing the Austro-Hungarians in Galicia, was commanded by Nikolai Iudovich Ivanov.

Communications would be a daunting challenge. The Russian supply of cable was insufficient to run telephone or telegraph connections from the rear; all they had was needed for field communications. Therefore, they relied on mobile wireless stations, which would link Zhilinsky to his two army commanders and with all corps commanders. The Russians were aware that the Germans had broken their ciphers, but they continued to use them until war broke out. A new code was ready but they were still very short of codebooks. Zhilinsky and Rennenkampf each had one; Samsonov did not. According to Prit Buttar, "Consequently, Samsonov concluded that he would have to take the risk of using uncoded radio messages."

== Prelude: 17–22 August ==
Rennenkampf's 1st Army crossed the frontier on 17 August, moving westward slowly. This was sooner than the Germans anticipated, because the Russian mobilization, including the Baltic and Warsaw districts, had begun secretly on 25 July, not with the Tsar's proclamation on 30 July.

Prittwitz attacked near Gumbinnen on 20 August, when he knew from intercepted wireless messages that Rennenkampf's infantry was resting. German I Corps commanded by Gen. Hermann von François was on their left, XVII Corps commanded by Lt. Gen. August von Mackensen in the center and I Reserve Corps led by Gen. Otto von Below on the right. A night march enabled one of François' divisions to hit the Russian 20th Army Corps' right flank at 04:00. Rennenkampf's men rallied to stoutly resist the attack. Their artillery was devastating until they ran out of ammunition, then the Russians retired. I Corps attacks were halted at 16:00 to rest men sapped by the torrid summer heat. François was sure they could win the next day. On his left, Mackensen's XVII Corps launched a vigorous frontal attack but the Russian infantry held firm. That afternoon the Russian heavy artillery struck back—the German infantry fled in panic, their artillery limbered up and joined the stampede. Prittwitz ordered I Corps and I Reserve Corps to break off the action and retreat also.

At noon, Prittwitz had telephoned Field Marshal Helmuth von Moltke the Younger at OHL (Oberste Heeresleitung, Supreme Headquarters) to report that all was going well; that evening he telephoned again to report disaster. His problems were compounded because an intercepted wireless message disclosed that the Russian 2nd Army included five Corps and a cavalry division, and aerial scouts saw their columns marching across the frontier. They were opposed by the reinforced German XX Corps, commanded by Lt. Gen. Friedrich von Scholtz. Their advance offered the possibility of cutting off any retreat westward while possibly encircling them between the two Russian armies. Prittwitz excitedly but inconclusively and repeatedly discussed the horrifying news with Moltke that evening on the telephone, shouting back and forth. At 20:23, 8th Army telegraphed OHL that they would withdraw to West Prussia.

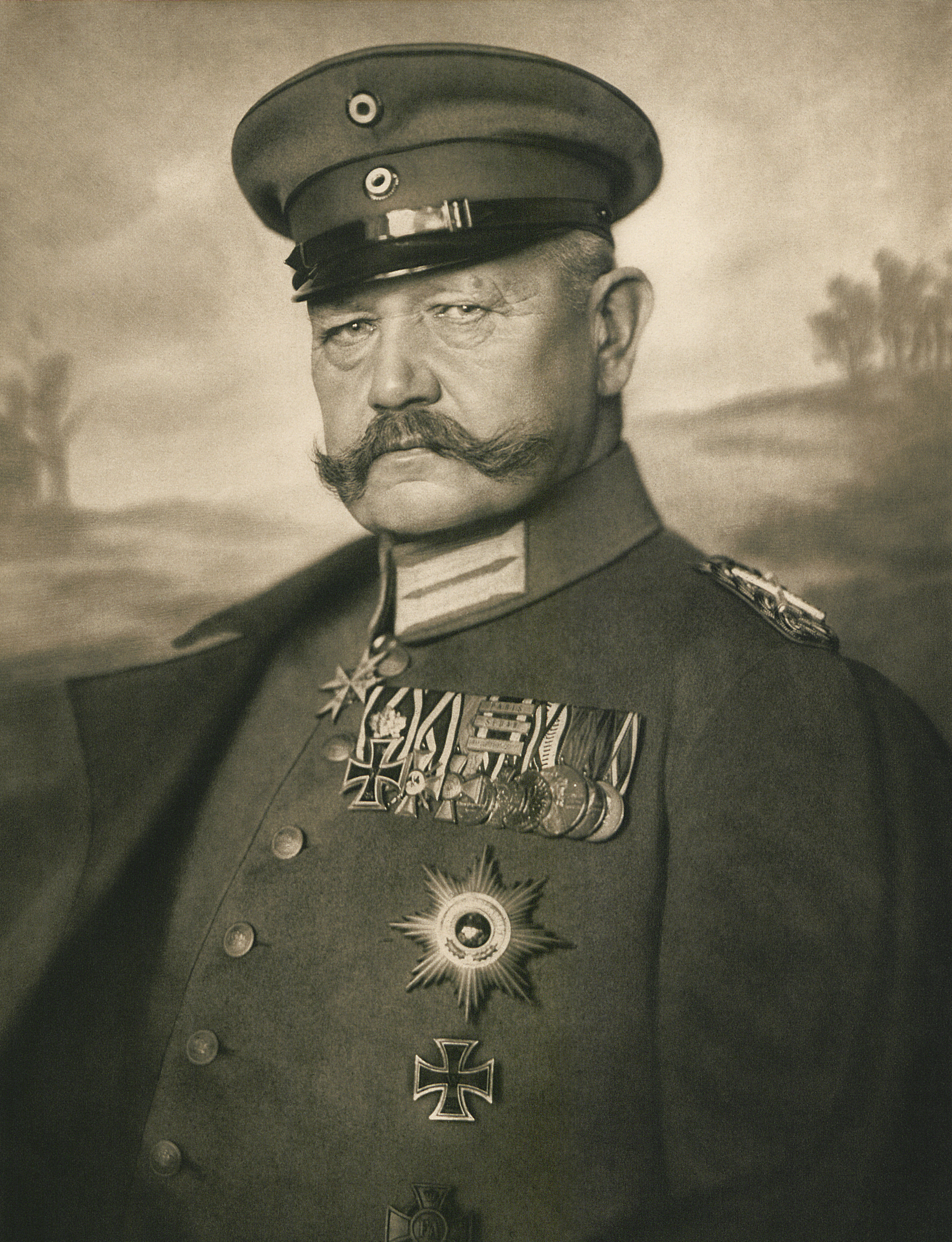
Generalfeldmarschall Paul von Hindenburg

By the next morning, 21 August, 8th Army staff realized that because Samsonov's 2nd Army was closer to the Vistula crossings than they were, they must first relocate most of their forces to join with XX Corps to block Samsonov before they could withdraw further. Now Moltke was told that they would only retreat a short distance. François protested directly to the Kaiser about his panicking superiors. That evening Prittwitz reported that the German 1st Cavalry Division had disappeared, only to later disclose that they had repulsed the Russian cavalry, capturing several hundred. By this point, Moltke had already decided to replace both Prittwitz and his chief of staff, Alfred von Waldersee. On the morning of 22 August their replacements, Col. Gen. Paul von Hindenburg and Maj. Gen. Erich Ludendorff, were notified of their new assignments.

The 8th Army issued orders to move to block Samsonov's 2nd Army. I Corps on the German left was closest to the railway, so it would take the long route by train to form up on the right side of XX Corps. The other two German corps would march the shorter distance to XX Corps' left. The 1st Cavalry Division and some older garrison troops would remain to screen Rennenkampf. On the afternoon of 22 August, the head of the 8th Army field railways was informed by telegraph that new commanders were coming by special train. The telegram relieving their former commanders came later. I Corps was moving over more than 150 km (93 miles) of rail, day and night, one train every 30 minutes, with 25 minutes to unload instead of the customary hour or two.

After the battle at Gumbinnen, Rennenkampf decided to pause his 1st Army to take resupply and to be in good positions if the Germans attacked again. This caused them to lose contact with the German Army, which he incorrectly reported was retreating in haste to the Vistula. Both Russian armies were having serious supply problems; everything had to be carted up from the railheads because they could not use the East Prussian railway track, and many units were hampered by a lack of field bakeries, ammunition carts and the like. The 2nd Army also was hampered by incompetent staff work and poor communications. Poor staff work not only exacerbated supply problems but, more importantly, caused Samsonov during the fighting to lose operational control over all but the two corps in his immediate vicinity (13th & 15th Army Corps).

On 21 August, Samsonov's 2nd Army crossed the border, and quickly took several border towns. The VI Corps took Ortelsburg, while I and XV Corps advanced onto Soldau and Neidenburg. On 22 August, Samsonov ordered XV Corps to advance towards Hohenstein, which they did on 23 August pushing Friedrich von Scholtz's XX Corps out of Lahna.

== Battle ==
=== Consolidation of the German 8th Army ===
The new commanders arrived at Marienburg (now Malbork) on the afternoon of 23 August; they had met for the first time on their special train the previous night and now they rendezvoused with the 8th Army staff. I Corps was moving by the rail line, and Ludendorff had previously counter-ordered it further east, at Deutsch-Eylau, where it could support the right of XX Corps. XVII Corps and I Reserve Corps would march towards the left of XX Corps. Ludendorff had delayed their marches for a day to rest while remaining in place should Rennenkampf attack. The German 1st Cavalry Division and some garrison troops of older men would remain as a screen just south of the eastern edge of the Königsberg defenses, facing Rennenkampf's 1st Army.

Hindenburg summarized his strategy, "We had not merely to win a victory over Samsonov. We had to annihilate him. Only thus could we get a free hand to deal with the second enemy, Rennenkampf, who was even then plundering and burning East Prussia." The new commander had raised the stakes dramatically. They must do more than stop Samsonov in his tracks, as they had tried to block and push back Rennenkampf. Samsonov must be annihilated before they turned back to deal with Rennenkampf. For the moment Samsonov would be opposed only by the forces he was already facing, XX Corps, mostly East Prussians who were defending their homes. The bulk of the Russian 2nd Army was still coming towards the front; if necessary, they would be allowed to push further into the province while the German reinforcements assembled on the flanks, poised to encircle the invaders—just the tactics instilled by Schlieffen.

=== Early phases of battle: 23–26 August ===
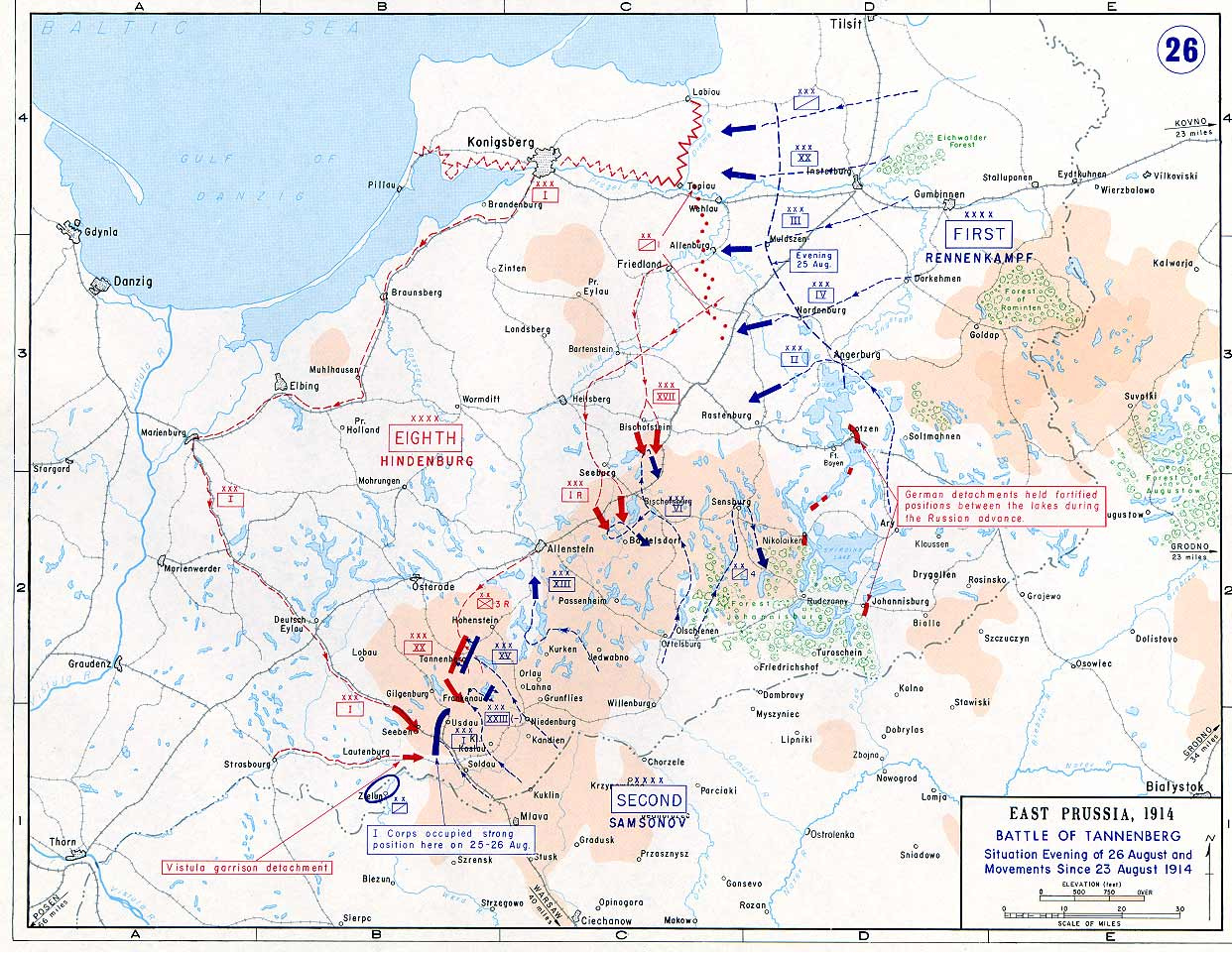
Movements of 23–26 August 1914, with Germans in red and Russians in blue

Zhilinsky had agreed to Samsonov's proposal to start the 2nd Army's advance further westward than originally planned, separating them even further from Rennenkampf's 1st Army. On 22 August Samsonov's forces encountered Germans all along their front and pushed them back in several places. Zhilinsky ordered him to pursue vigorously. They already had been advancing for six days in sweltering heat without sufficient rest along primitive roads, averaging 24 km (15 mi) a day and had outrun their supplies. On 23 August they attacked the German XX Corps, which retreated to the Orlau-Frankenau line that night. The Russians followed, and on the 24th they attacked again; the now partially entrenched XX Corps temporarily stopped their advance before retreating to avoid possible encirclement. At one stage the chief of staff of the corps directed artillery fire onto his own dwelling.

Samsonov saw a wonderful opportunity because, as far as he was aware, both of his flanks were unopposed. He ordered most of his units to the northwest, toward the river Vistula, leaving only his VI Corps to continue north towards their original objective of Seeburg. He did not have enough aircraft or skilled cavalry to detect the German buildup on his left. Rennenkampf mistakenly reported that two of the German Corps had sheltered in the Königsberg fortifications.

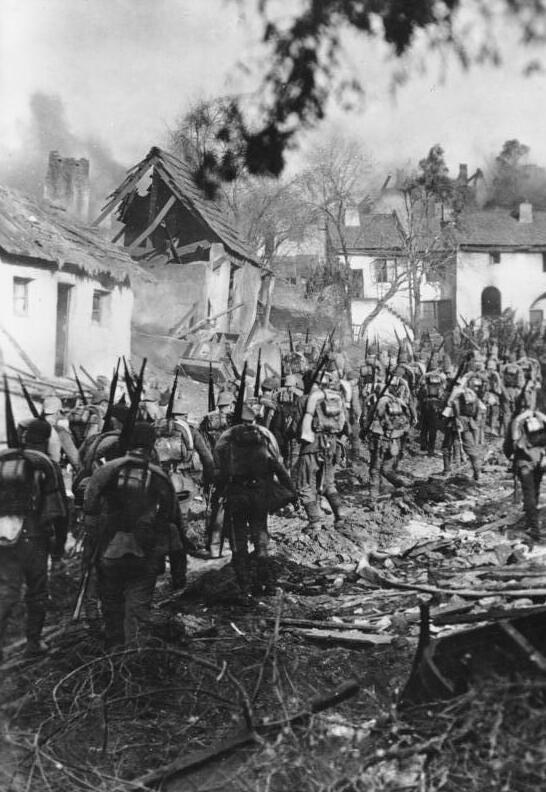
German infantry during the Battle of Tannenberg

On 24 August Hindenburg, Ludendorff and Hoffmann motored along the German lines to meet Scholtz and his principal subordinates, sharing the roads with panic-stricken refugees; in the background were columns of smoke from burning villages ignited by artillery shells. They could keep control of their army because most of the local telephone operators remained at their switchboards, carefully tracking the motorcade. Along the way they drove through the village of Tannenberg (today called Stębark), which reminded the two younger men of the defeat of the Teutonic Knights there by the Poles and Lithuanians in 1410; Hindenburg had been thinking about that battle since the evening before when he strolled near the ruins of the castle of the Teutonic Order. (In 1910 Slavs had commemorated their triumph on the old battlefield.)

Aided by Russian radio intercepts, a captured map of Russian positions, and information from fleeing German civilians of Rennenkampf's slow progress, Hindenburg and Ludendorff planned the encirclement of the Russian 2nd Army. I Corps and XX Corps would attack from Gilgenburg towards Neidenburg, while XVII Corps and I Reserve Corps attacked the Russian right flank. They met with Scholtz and his XX Corps staff on 24 August, and François on 25 August, where he was ordered to attack towards Usdau on 26 August. François stated only part of his corps and artillery had arrived. Ludendorf insisted the attack must go forward as planned, since more trains were expected beforehand. François replied, "If it is so ordered, of course an attack will be made, and the troops will obviously have to fight with bayonets."

On the way back to headquarters Hoffmann received new radio intercepts. Rennenkampf's most recent orders from Zhilinsky were to continue due west, not turn south-westward towards Samsonov, who was instructed to continue his own drive northwest further away from Rennenkampf. Based on this information Scholtz formed a new defensive flank along the Drewenz River, while his main line strengthened their defenses. Back at headquarters Hindenburg told the staff, "Gentlemen. Our preparations are so well in hand that we can sleep soundly tonight."

Samsonov was concerned by the German resistance with their earlier advance, and aerial reconnaissance spotted the arrival of the German I Corps. Zhilinsky and Samsonov could not reach an agreement on the direction of the army. The dispute over the direction of attack resulted in a compromise: on the 24th, the 2nd Army was sent to the Allenstein–Osterode front, leaving the VI Corps on the move to Bischofsburg at Zhilinsky's request, i.e. separating it from the rest of the army by 2½ marches and thereby exposing it to a separate defeat. These negotiations, as well as the negotiations about a day's rest, which Samsonov insistently demanded, led to the fact that, apart from the VI Corps, the army barely moved on the 25th. The order from Zhilinsky was to attack northwest as per Samsonov's aim, with Martos' XV Corps and Klyuev's XII Corps, while I Corps protected the left flank, and VI Corps was positioned on the right at Bischofsburg.

=== Main battle: 27–30 August ===
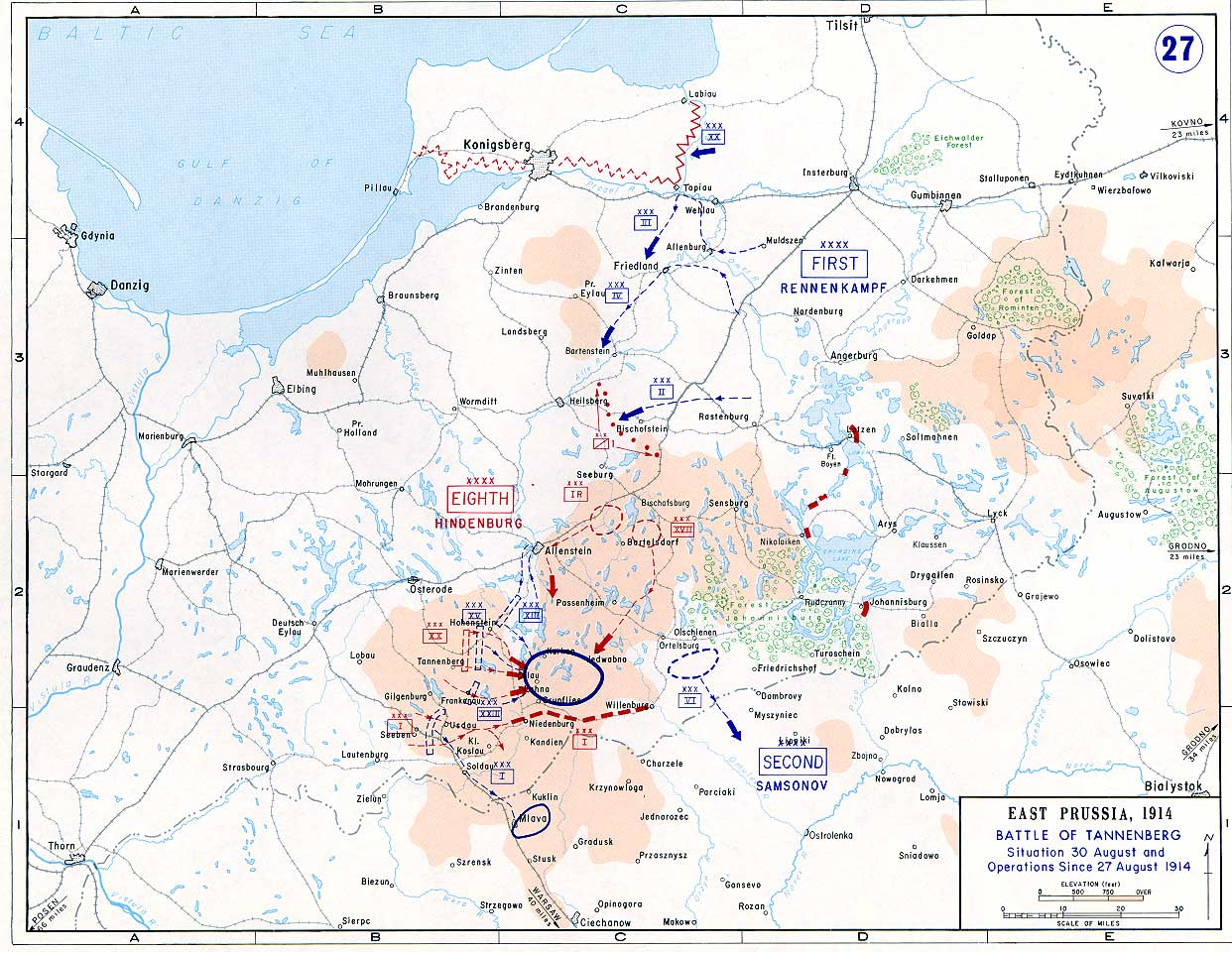
Movements of 27–30 August

Zhilinsky was visited by the commander of the Russian Army, the Grand Duke Nicholas Nikolaevich of Russia, who ordered him to support Samsonov.

François commenced his attack early on the 25th, with his 1st Infantry Division advancing towards Seeben, his 2nd Infantry division on its southern flank, and the rest of his corps arriving by train during the day. He captured Seeben by mid-afternoon, but saved an advance on Usdau for the next day. North of François, Scholtz's 37th and 41st Infantry Divisions faced the Russian 2nd Infantry Division, which fell back with heavy losses. On the left flank of Scholtz's XX Corps, Curt von Morgen's 3rd Reserve Division was ordered to advance onto Hohenstein, but held back out of concern that the Russian XV and XII Corps would threaten his left flank. Klyuev's Russian XIII Corps was ordered to advance onto Allenstein. On Samsonov's right flank, Alexander Blagoveschensky's Russian VI corps soon faced Mackensen's German XVII Corps and von Below's German I Reserve Corps. Von Below, to the right of Mackensen, advanced to cut the road between Bischofsburg and Wartenburg. Blagoveschensky's 16th Infantry Division occupied Bischofsburg, while his 4th Infantry Division was north of Rothfliess, and his 4th Cavalry division was at Sensburg. The 16th Infantry division was ordered to move towards Allenstein, while the 4th Infantry Division was split between Lautern and Gross-Bössau. Mackensen's 36th Infantry Division, on the right, and his 35th infantry Division, on the left, advanced towards Bischofsburg. The Russian 4th Infantry Division suffered heavy losses and retreated towards Ortelsburg. In an attempt to send reinforcements, Blagoveschensky split the 16th Infantry Division between Bischofsburg and Ramsau. However, they were met in the flank and rear by von Belows's I Reserve Corps, and retreated in disarray.

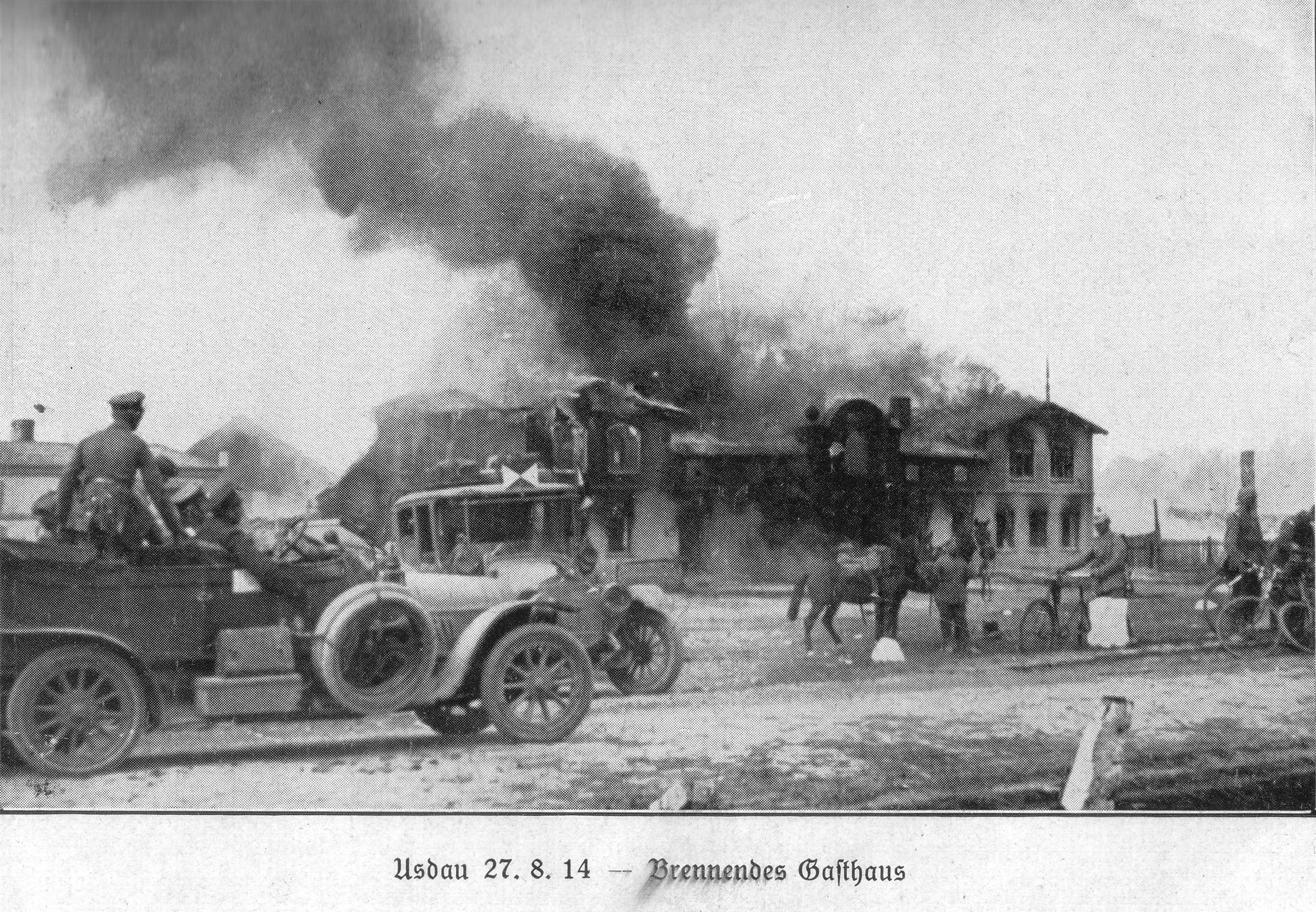
A burning Gasthaus during the fight at Usdau on 27 August

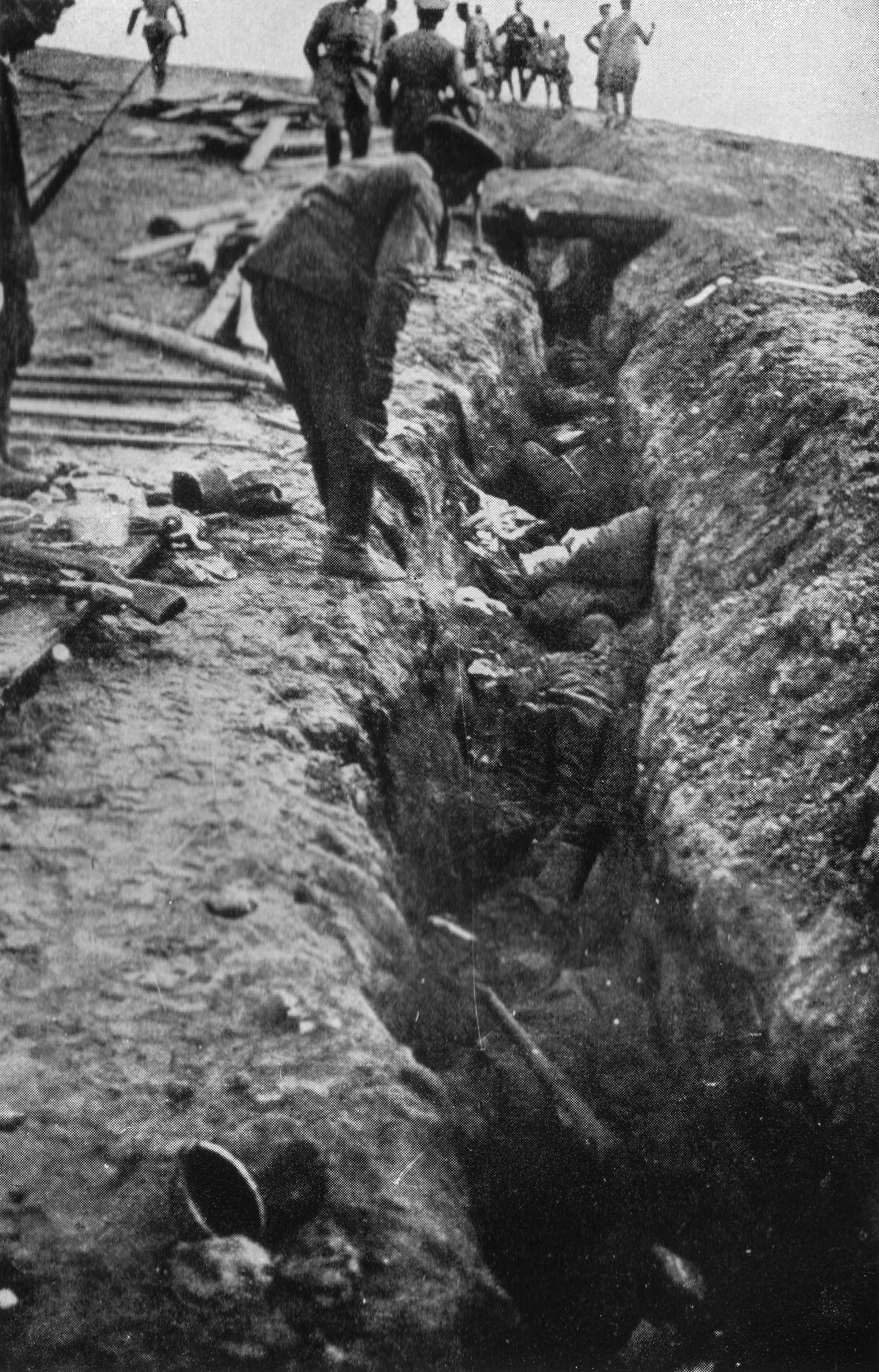
Dead Russian soldiers in a trench near Usdau

That evening the 8th Army's staff was on edge. Little had been achieved during the day, when they had intended to spring the trap. XX Corps had done well on another torrid day, but now was exhausted. On their far left they knew that XVII Corps and I Reserve Corps were coming into action, but headquarters had learned little about their progress. In fact, XVII Corps had defeated the Russian VI Corps, which fled back along the roads. XVII Corps had endured long marches in sweltering weather, but some men still had the energy to pursue on bicycles requisitioned from civilians. Hoffmann, who had been an observer with the Japanese in Manchuria, tried to ease their nerves by telling how Samsonov and Rennenkampf had quarreled during that war, so they would do nothing to help one another. It was a good story that Hoffmann treasured and retold frequently. In Hindenburg's words "It was now apparent that danger was threatening from the side of Rennenkampf. It was reported that one of his corps was on the march through Angerburg. It is surprising that misgivings filled many a heart, that firm resolution began to yield to vacillation, and that doubts crept in where a clear vision had hitherto prevailed? We overcame the inward crisis, adhered to our original intention, and turned in full strength to effect its realization by attack." The German right flank would advance to Neidenburg, while von Below's I Reserve Corps advanced to Allenstein, and Mackensen's XVII Corps chased Blagoveschensky's retreating VI Corps.

François was ready to attack the Russian left decisively on 27 August, hitting the Russian 1st Army Corps. His artillery barrage was overwhelming, and soon he had taken the key town of Usdau. In the center the Russians continued to strongly attack the German XX Corps and to move northwest from Allenstein. The German XVII Corps and I Reserve Corps pushed the Russian right wing they had bloodied the day before further back. Gen. Basil Gourko (Vasily Gurko), commanding the Russian 1st Army Cavalry Division (and from 1916 to 1917 chief of the general staff), was told later that Samsonov was not aware of what was happening on his flanks because he was observing the action from a rise in the ground a distance from his wireless set and reports were not relayed to him.

On the evening of the 27th, the Germans gave an order for encirclement, the essence of which is set out in the following report from Ludendorff to the high command:

"The Russian 1st Army Corps has been thrown back from Gilgenburg to Soldau. The Russian 6th Army Corps has been thrown back from Bischofsburg to Ortelsburg. Parts of the 23rd Army Corps have been defeated and are retreating to Neidenburg. The 13th and 15th Army Corps still occupy the Hohenstein, Allenstein region, and will be attacked tomorrow, if possible, from all sides".

On the morning of 28 August the German commanders were motoring along the front when they were shown a report from an aerial observer that Rennenkampf's army was moving towards their rear. Ludendorff announced that the attack on the 2nd Army must be broken off. Hindenburg led him behind a nearby hedge; when they emerged Hindenburg calmly said that operations would continue as planned. Later radio intercepts confirmed Rennenkampf was still slowly advancing on Königsberg. François' I Corps resumed his assault on the Russian 1st Army Corps, taking Soldau by late morning, and then advancing onto Neidenburg, as the Russian 1st Army Corps became an ineffective force in the battle. Scholtz's XX Corps, to the north, also advanced. Though his 41st Infantry Division was badly mauled by Martos' Russian 15th Army Corps, it held its ground, while the German 37th Infantry Division reached Hohenstein by the end of the day. The German 3rd Reserve Division was also able to advance on the Russian 15th Army Corps, forcing Samsonov to order a retreat to Neidenburg. Von Below's German I Reserve Corps engaged Klyuev's Russian 13th Army Corps west of Allenstein, and became isolated. Klyuev received orders from Samsonov to retreat towards Kurken. Mackensen's German XVII Corps continued pursuing the retreating Russians. One half of the German encirclement was complete by the end of the day, as Ludendorff wrote, "The enemy front seemed to be breaking up... We did not have a clear picture of the situation with individual units. But there was no doubt that the battle was won."

On 29 August, François' cavalry regiment reached Willenberg by evening, while his 1st Infantry Division occupied the road between Neidenburg and Willenberg. François' I Corps patrols linked up with Mackensen's German XVII Corps, who had advanced to Jedwabno, completing the encirclement. On 29 August the troops from the Russian 2nd Army's center who were retreating south ran into a German defensive line. Those Russians who tried to break through by dashing across open fields heavy with crops were mowed down. They were in a cauldron centered at Frogenau, west of Tannenberg, and throughout the day they were relentlessly pounded by artillery. Many surrendered – long columns of prisoners jammed the roads away from the battleground. Hindenburg and Ludendorff watched from a hilltop, with only a single field telephone line; thereafter they stayed closer to the telephone network. Hindenburg met one captured Russian corps commander that day, another on the day following. On 30 August the Russians remaining outside of the cauldron tried unsuccessfully to break open the snare. Rather than report the loss of his army to Tsar Nicholas II, Samsonov disappeared into the woods that night and committed suicide. His body was found in the following year and returned to Russia by the Red Cross.

On 31 August Hindenburg formally reported to Kaiser Wilhelm II that three Russian army corps (13th, 15th and 23rd) had been destroyed. The two corps (1st and 6th) that had not been caught in the cauldron had been severely bloodied and were retreating back to Poland. He requested that the battle be named Tannenberg (an imaginative touch that both Ludendorff and Hoffmann claimed as their own).

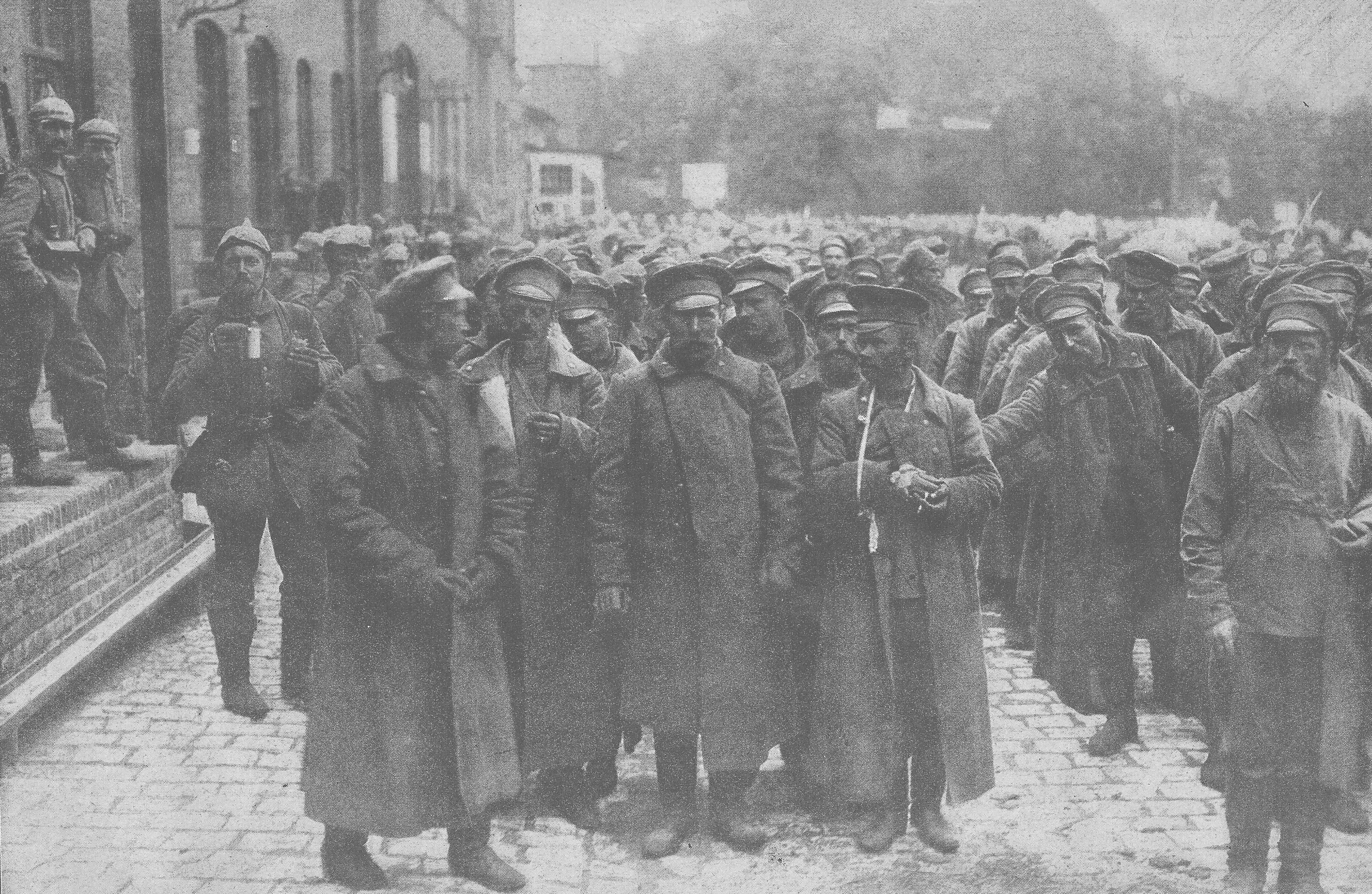
Russian prisoners of war at Tilsit railway station

The 2nd Army lost approximately 120,000, but, taking into account the attacks, it continued to pose a threat to the Germans from the rear; it still had 116,791 men and 435 guns. The Russian command continued to be active on the flanks of the German 8th Army, which affected the fact that the Germans were unable to destroy the 1st in the First Battle of the Masurian Lakes. The Germans suffered just 12,000 casualties out of the 150,000 men committed to the battle, incl. 1,888 killed, 6,579 wounded and 4,588 missing. There is probably some data, since the authors who referred to the named lists of losses cannot single out the losses of officers. According to other estimates, the Hindenburg army lost c. 30,000 men.> Sixty trains were required to take captured Russian equipment to Germany. The German official history estimated 50,000 Russians killed and wounded, which were never properly recorded. Another estimate gives 30,000 Russians killed or wounded, with 13 generals and 500 guns captured.

The main reason for the defeat of the 2nd Army lies in Samsonov's neglect of radio communications, as a result of which they attacked blindly, and the Germans knew about his exact location. As noted, Samsonov could have avoided disaster, given that the first attempt to encircle the Russian army for the Germans ended in a bloody failure at Lake Waplitz, as a result of which the German XX Corps on the flanks was repulsed, and the 41st Division from its composition was partially destroyed. Samsonov, due to the fact that he went to the center of the position of his troops for personal encouragement of the latter, did not know about this. As a result, this very center was surrounded.

== Aftermath ==
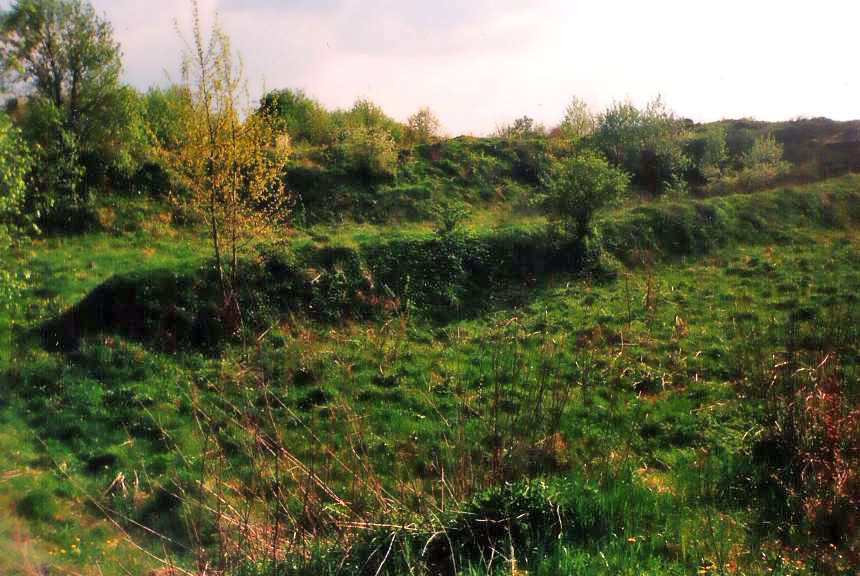
1998 photo of the foundations of the Tannenberg Memorial – the former burial site of Paul von Hindenburg

To David Stevenson it was "a major victory but far from decisive", because the Russian 1st Army was still in East Prussia. It set the stage for the First Battle of the Masurian Lakes a week later, when the reinforced German 8th Army confronted the Russian 1st Army. Rennenkampf retreated hastily back over the pre-war border before they could be encircled.

British Field Marshal Sir Edmund Ironside saw Tannenberg as the "… greatest defeat suffered by any of the combatants during the war". It was a tactical masterpiece that demonstrated the superior skills of the German army. Their pre-war organization and training had proven themselves, which bolstered German morale while severely shaking Russian confidence. Nonetheless, as long as the great battle in the West continued the outnumbered Germans had to remain on the defensive in the East, anticipating that the Russians would make another thrust from Poland against Germany, and because the Russians had defeated the Austro-Hungarians in the Battle of Galicia; their allies would need help.

The Russian official inquiry into the disaster blamed Zhilinsky for not controlling his two armies. He was replaced in the Northwest Command and sent to liaise with the French. Rennenkampf was exonerated, but was retired after a dubious performance in Poland in 1916.

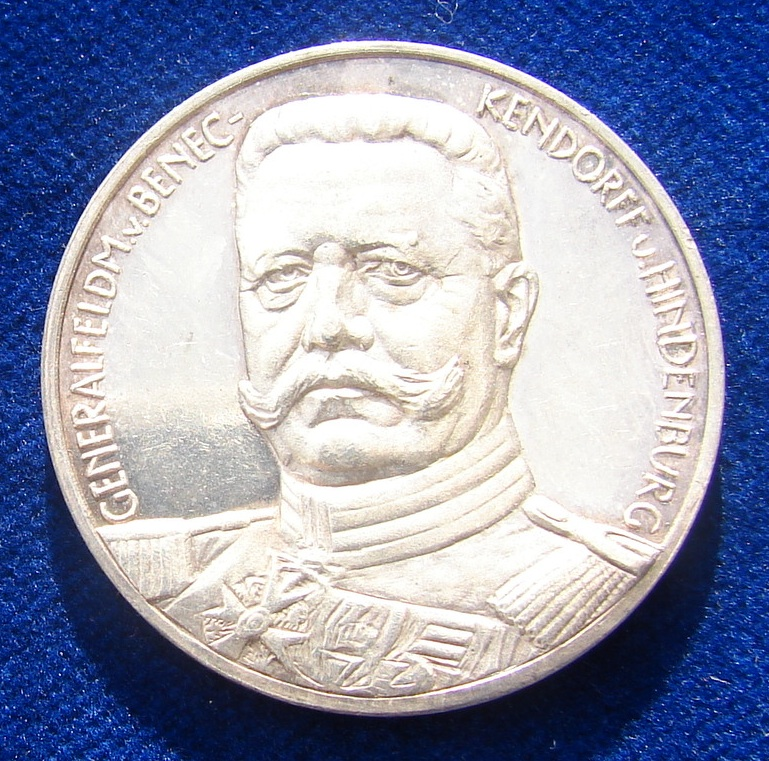
The face of a World War I German Silver medallion liberation of East Prussia 1914 by Paul von Beneckendorff und von Hindenburg.

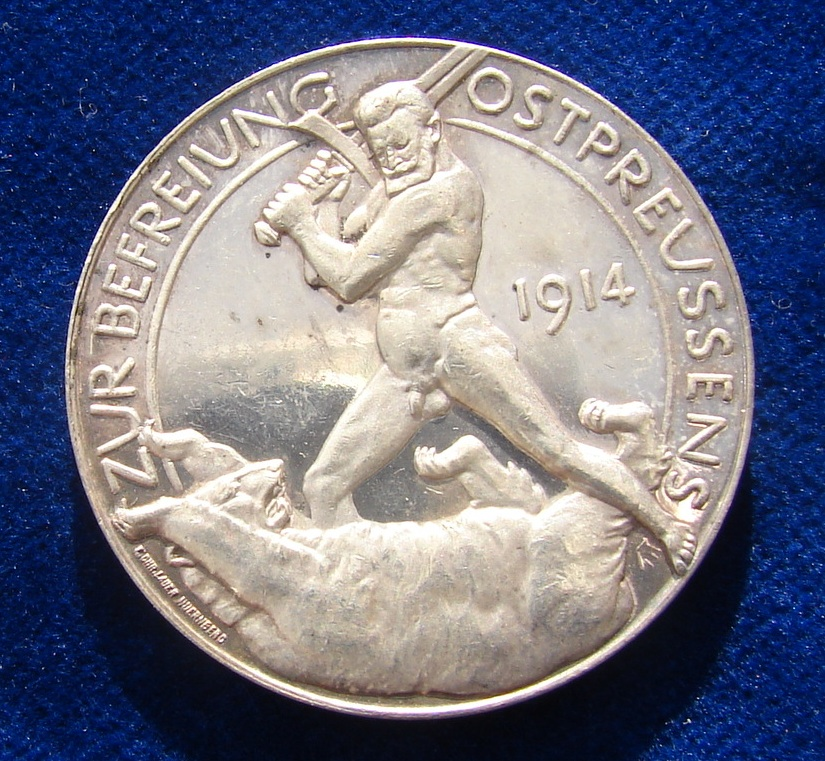
The reverse of a World War I German Silver medallion liberation of East Prussia 1914 by Paul von Beneckendorff und von Hindenburg. Referring to the Battle of Tannenberg. The naked Gen. Hindenburg fighting the Russian Bear with his sword.

Hindenburg was hailed as an epic hero and Ludendorff was praised, but Hoffmann was generally ignored by the press. Apparently not pleased by this, he later gave tours of the area, noting: "This is where the Field Marshal slept before the battle, this is where he slept after the battle, and this is where he slept during the battle." However, Hindenburg countered by saying: "If the battle had gone badly, the name 'Hindenburg' would have been reviled from one end of Germany to the other." Hoffmann is not mentioned in Hindenburg's memoirs. In his memoirs Ludendorff takes credit for the encirclement and most historians give him full responsibility for conducting the battle. Hindenburg wrote and spoke of "we", and when questioned about the crucial tête-à-tête with Ludendorff after dinner on 26 August resolutely maintained that they had calmly discussed their options and resolved to continue with the encirclement. Military historian Walter Elze wrote that a few months before his death Hindenburg finally acknowledged that Ludendorff had been in a state of panic that evening. Hindenburg would also remark: "After all, I know something about the business, I was the instructor in tactics at the War Academy for six years".

The defeat of the 2nd Army, which occurred almost by accident, inspired the German command with too much self-confidence. As a result, they tried to repeat the success of the battle already in Poland, near Warsaw in October 1914 as part of the Battle of the Vistula River and the Battle of Łódź. In the first case, the new commander of the same 2nd Army Sergei Sheydeman involved the Germans in protracted unnecessary battles, which is why they eventually retreated. At Łódź, when trying to bypass Scheidmann's army, they themselves fell into the cauldron thanks to the help of Plehve's 5th Army.

== Casualties ==
Russian casualties as a result of the battle are often discussed among historians. In his memoirs, Hindenburg gave the number of Russian prisoners as 92,000 (this is also confirmed by the Reichsarchiv,) in addition to 50,000 killed in action. However, these figures may be false, since only half of Samsonov's total army was encircled. (Note: No more than two corps were surrounded, which successfully operated separately from the rest of the army. The Germans were able to surround them only because of the mistakes of the Russian command and the lack of normal communication with the 1st Army.) Some of the troops were also able to break out of the encirclement; as such, the losses cannot be more than 80,000 people according to Alexei Oleynikov. An attempt to analyze the reports of units of formations participating in the battle shows that Russian losses can reach 120,219, including 5,522 killed, 12,326 wounded and 75,435 missing. 26,936 could not be divided into categories, but most likely they are dead.

== Post-war legacy ==
A German monument commemorating the battle was completed in 1927 in Hohenstein. However, it was blown up in World War II by the Germans during their retreat from Prussia in January 1945.

German film director Heinz Paul made a film, Tannenberg, about the battle, shot in East Prussia in 1932.

The battle is at the center of Aleksandr Solzhenitsyn's novel August 1914, published in 1971, and is featured in the video games Darkest of Days and Tannenberg.

== Bibliography ==
- Brusilov, Aleksei (2023). Мои воспоминания. Из царской армии в Красную [My Memories: From the Tsarist Army to the Red] (in Russian). Moscow: Москва. ISBN 978-5-04-176827-0.
- Buttar, Prit (2016). Collision of Empires, The War on the Eastern Front in 1914. Oxford: Osprey Publishing. ISBN 978-1472813183.
- Creveld, Martin van (2004). Supplying War: Logistics from Wallenstein to Patton. Cambridge University Press. ISBN 978-0521837446.
- Elder, Gregory (June 2006). "Intelligence in War: It Can Be Decisive". Studies in Intelligence. 50 (2): 13–25. ISSN 1527-0874. Archived from the original on 15 August 2025.
- Golovin, Nikolai (1926). Из истории кампании 1914 года на русском фронте. Начало войны и операции в Восточной Пруссии [From the history of the 1914 campaign on the Russian front. The beginning of the war and operations in East Prussia].
- Hastings, Max (2013). Catastrophe 1914: Europe Goes to War. Knopf Press. ISBN 978-0307597052.
- Hindenburg, Paul von (1921). Out of my Life. Translated by Holt, F.A. London: Harper & Brothers. Archived from the original on 30 March 2025 – via HathiTrust.
- Lincoln, W. Bruce (1986). Passage through Armageddon: The Russians in War & Revolution, 1914-1918. New York: Simon & Schuster. ISBN 0671557092.
- Ludendorff, Erich (1919). My War Memories, 1914–1918. OCLC 60104290.
- Nelipovich, Sergei G. (2023). Два похода. Борьба за Восточную Пруссию в августе-октябре 1914 [Two campaigns. The Struggle for East Prussia in August-October 1914]. Забытые войны России (in Russian). Moscow: Квадрига. ISBN 978-5-91791-376-6.
- Oleynikov, Alexei (2016). Россия-щит Антанты [Russia-Shield of Entente]. Foreword by Nikolai Starikov. St.Petersburg: Piter. ISBN 978-5-496-01795-4.
- Oleynikov, А. (2023). Германский натиск на Восток 1915 [The German push to the East 1915] (in Russian). Veče. ISBN 978-5-4484-4327-5.
- Showalter, Dennis E (1991). Tannenberg: Clash of Empires, 1914 (2004 ed.). Brassey's. ISBN 978-1-57488-781-5.
- Reichsarchiv, ed. (1929). Der Herbstfeldzug 1914 Im Westen bis zum Stellungskrieg, im Osten bis zum Rückzug [The Autumn Campaign of 1914; 1. In the West until trench warfare, in the East until retreat]. Der Weltkrieg 1914 bis 1918 (in German). Vol. V. Berlin: Mittler & Sohn. OCLC 1070932306.
- Stevenson, David (2004). 1914–1918: The History of the First World War. Penguin Books Ltd. ISBN 978-0-14-026817-1.
- Strachan, Hew (2001). The First World War. Oxford: Oxford UP. ISBN 978-0-19-926191-8.
- West, Nigel (2013). Historical Dictionary of World War I Intelligence. Bloomsbury. ISBN 978-0810880016.
- Zayonchkovski, Andrey (2002) [1929]. ru:Первая Мировая Война [The First World War]. St.Petersburg: Poligon. ISBN 5-89173-174-6.
- Tsikhovich, Y. K. (1922). Стратегический очерк войны 1914–1918 гг [Strategic Study of the War of 1914–1918]. Vol. 1. Высший военный редакционный совет. Archived from the original on 23 May 2025.
