= 5th Rifle Division =

5th Rifle Division may refer to:

- 5th Rifle Division (Poland)
- 5th Rifle Division (Soviet Union)
- 5th Guards Rifle Division
- 5th Guards Motor Rifle Division
- 5th Siberian Rifle Division

== See also ==
- 5th Division (disambiguation)
