= 50th Army Corps (Russian Empire) =

- Country: Russian Empire
- Allegiance: Imperial Russian Army
- Engagements: World War I

The 50th Army Corps was an army corps in the Imperial Russian Army during World War I.

== History ==
On 15 June 1916, the corps probably included the 81st Infantry Division and the 112th Infantry Division, as part of the 2nd Army. The corps remained part of the army until December 1917. Alexei Baiov commanded the corps from 22 October 1917.

== Part of ==
- 2nd Army: 1917
