= Caucasus Cavalry Division =

Caucasus Cavalry Division can refer to:

- Caucasus Cavalry Division (Russian Empire)
- Caucasian Native Cavalry Division
