= 2nd Rifle Division =

2nd Rifle Division can refer to:

- 2nd Rifle Division (Poland)
- 2nd Rifle Division (Soviet Union)
- 2nd Siberian Rifle Division
