= 6th Cavalry Division (Russian Empire) =

- 6-я кавалерийская дивизия
- Active: 1914–1918
- Country: Russian Empire
- Branch: Russian Imperial Army
- Role: Cavalry
- Engagements: World War I; Battle of Tannenberg; Battle of Łódź (1914); Battle of the Vistula River

The 6th Cavalry Division (Russian: 6-я кавалерийская дивизия, 6-ya Kavaleriiskaya Diviziya) was a cavalry formation of the Russian Imperial Army.

== Organization ==
- 1st Cavalry Brigade
  - 6th Regiment of Dragoons
  - 6th Uhlan Regiment
- 2nd Cavalry Brigade
  - 6th Regiment of Hussars
  - 6th Regiment of Cossacks
- 6th Horse Artillery Division

== Chiefs of Staff ==
- 1884–1886: Vladimir Alexandrovich Bekman
