= Sergei Sheydeman =

Russian and Soviet general (1857–1920)

Sergei Mikhailovich Sheydeman
- Born: 18 August 1857
- Died: 1920 (aged 62–63)
- Allegiance: Russian Empire; Russian Soviet Federative Socialist Republic
- Branch: Imperial Russian Army; Red Army
- Rank: General of the Cavalry
- Commands: 3rd Cavalry Division; 2nd Army Corps; 2nd Army
- Battles / wars: Russo-Turkish War; World War I; Battle of Tannenberg; Battle of Łódź; Battle of the Vistula River; Russian Civil War

Sergei Mikhailovich Sheydeman (Russian: Сергей Михайлович Шейдеман; German: Sergei Michailowitsch Scheidemann; August 18, 1857 – February 29th 1920) was an army commander of the Imperial Russian Army in World War I. After the October Revolution, he sided with the Bolsheviks.

== Military service ==
Sheydeman graduated from the Petrovsky Poltava military gymnasium and entered military service on 9 August 1874. In 1877 he graduated from the Mikhailovsky Artillery Academy and was commissioned as a second lieutenant and assigned to the 19th Horse Artillery battery. He later transferred to the 3rd Guards Grenadier Artillery Brigade. He participated in the Russo-Turkish War of 1877-1878, and received a promotion to lieutenant on 18 December 1878.

In 1883, Sheydeman graduated from the Nikolaev Academy of the General Staff in the second category. He was assigned to the staff of the Kiev Military District. On 6 December 1883, he was promoted to headquarters captain, and on 9 December 1883 he was appointed senior adjutant to the headquarters of the 11th Cavalry Division. On 29 March 1885, he was promoted to captain.

On 1 December 1888, Sheydeman took command of a squadron of the 34th Dragoon Starodubovsky Regiment. On 16 December 1889, he returned to the 11th Cavalry Division as a senior adjutant of its headquarters. On 1 April 1890, he was appointed lieutenant colonel by the officer in charge for special assignments at the headquarters of the 2nd Army Corps.

On 26 August 1892, Sheydeman became senior adjutant to the headquarters of the Vilnius Military District. He was promoted to colonel on 17 April 1894. From 6 May to 6 November 1895 he was seconded to the 4th Life-Dragoon Pskov Regiment to familiarize himself with the general requirements of management and leadership.

On 2 December 1896, Sheydeman was appointed chief of staff of the 4th Cavalry Division. On 22 March 1901, he became commander of the 1st Life-Dragoon Moscow Regiment. On 21 March 1902 he became an assistant chief of staff of the Moscow Military District. He was promoted to major general on 14 December 1902. He was appointed District Quartermaster General of the Headquarters of the Moscow Military District on 20 May 1905. During the 1905 Russian Revolution, when an uprising broke out in Moscow in December 1905, he issued an order on 18 December 1905 that said in part: “If armed resistance is provided, then exterminate everyone without arresting anyone.”

Sheydeman took charge of the headquarters of the Amur Military District on 27 November 1906. He was promoted to lieutenant general on 6 December 1907. On 31 August 1908 took command of the 3rd Cavalry Division. On 15 May 1912, he became commander of the 2nd Army Corps (which consisted of the 26th and 43rd Infantry Divisions), a component of the 2nd Army under the command of General Alexander Samsonov. On 14 April 1913, Sheydeman was promoted to general of the cavalry.

=== World War I ===
World War I broke out when Austria-Hungary invaded Serbia on 28 July 1914. Russia entered the war on 1 August 1914. On 22 August 1914, Sheydeman's 2nd Army Corps was transferred to the 1st Army under General Paul von Rennenkampf. After General Samsonov's 2nd Army was almost completed destroyed during the Russian defeat in the Battle of Tannenberg in late August and an ashamed Samsonov committed suicide, Sheydeman took command of the 2nd Army on 5 September 1914. In September, Sheydeman's 2nd Army participated in the Russian offensive in East Prussia. Although the 2nd Army delivered a blow from the south that forced the Imperial German Army to divert some forces to face it and saved the Russian 1st Army from destruction, the Russian offensive ended in a Russian defeat.

In October 1914, the 2nd Army took part in the Battle of the Vistula River. On 7 October 1914, German troops under General August von Mackensen attacked the 2nd Army near Troitsa. On 11 October, Sheydeman's 2nd Siberian Army Corps took the Warsaw forts. Three days later, the forces of the 1st Siberian, 2nd Siberian, 1st, 2nd, and 4th Army Corps attacked the Mackensen group in the Prutkov region. They took Błonie and Sochaczew on 15–17 October, and on 24 October Scheidemann's army threw the German 9th Army back behind Rawka river. On 30 October Sheydeman's troops occupied Łódź.

In November 1914, the 2nd Army took part in the Battle of Łódź. Sheydeman was not able to prevent the encirclement of Łódź and on 20 November 1914 he was removed from command by General Nikolai Ruzsky for his misunderstanding of the situation. On 5 December 1914, he officially relinquished command of the 2nd Army to General Vladimir Vasilyevich Smirnov, and took command of the 1st Turkestan Army Corps.

In 1916, Sheydeman successfully acted as part of the 8th Army during the successful Brusilov Offensive on the Southwestern Front. Between 5 and 9 July, in the battles at Tuman and Rosinich, Sheydeman broke the group of General Fata and forced a crossing of the river Stokhod. Under pressure from German troops, he was forced to withdraw his corps back across the Stokhod on 10–11 July.

Due to illness, Sheydeman transferred on 4 June 1917 to the reserves at the headquarters of the Kiev Military District. After returning to active duty, he was appointed commander of the 10th Army in November 1917.

=== Russian Civil War ===
In 1918, Sheydeman voluntarily joined the Red Army and was appointed military leader of the Ryazan unit screening the Moscow region. In the Russian Civil War, he commanded the Red Army's 1st Ryazan Infantry Division. From 22 October to 5 November 1919 he headed the headquarters of the 17th Cavalry Division of the Red Cossacks.

Subsequently, Sheydeman was arrested. According to some reports, he died in prison.

== Awards and honors ==
- Order of Saint Anna, 4th class (1879)
- Order of Saint Stanislaus, 3rd class (1886)
- Order of Saint Anna, 3rd class (1889)
- Order of Saint Stanislaus, 2nd class (1893)
- Order of Saint Vladimir, 4th class (1896)
- Order of Saint Vladimir, 3rd class (1905)
- Order of Saint Stanislaus, 1st class (1906)
- Order of Saint Anna, 1st class (1910)
- Order of Saint Alexander Nevsky (15 March 1916)

Preceded by	Chief of Staff of the 4th Cavalry Division; 1896–1901	Succeeded by
Preceded by	Commander of the 3rd Cavalry Division; 1908–1912	Succeeded by
Preceded by	Commander of the 2nd Army Corps; 1912–1914	Succeeded by
Preceded by Alexander Samsonov	Commander of the 2nd Army; September–December 1914	Succeeded by Vladimir Vasilyevich Smirnov
