= 77th Infantry Division (Russian Empire) =

- 77-я пехотная дивизия
- Active: 1904–1906; 1914–1918
- Country: Russian Empire
- Branch: Russian Imperial Army
- Role: Infantry
- Engagements: World War I; Battle of the Vistula River

The 77th Infantry Division (Russian: 77-я пехотная дивизия, 77-ya Pekhotnaya Diviziya) was an infantry formation of the Russian Imperial Army.

== History ==
The 77th was created as a reserve unit to replace active units sent into combat during the Russo-Japanese War in 1904 under the command of Major General Alexander Lebedev. It was disbanded in 1906.

It was again formed as a reserve division in 1914 when the Russian Imperial Army mobilized for World War I. It was disbanded in 1918 when the army demobilized following the Russian Revolution.

== Organization ==
- 1st Brigade
  - 305th Infantry Regiment
  - 306th Infantry Regiment
- 2nd Brigade
  - 307th Infantry Regiment
  - 308th Infantry Regiment
