= 14th Cavalry Division (Russian Empire) =

- 14-я кавалерийская дивизия
- Active: 1914–1918
- Country: Russian Empire
- Branch: Russian Imperial Army
- Role: Cavalry
- Engagements: World War I; Battle of the Vistula River

The 14th Cavalry Division (Russian: 14-я кавалерийская дивизия, 14-ya Kavaleriiskaya Diviziya) was a cavalry formation of the Russian Imperial Army.

== Organization ==
- 1st Cavalry Brigade
  - 14th Regiment of Dragoons
  - 14th Uhlan Regiment
- 2nd Cavalry Brigade
  - 14th Regiment of Hussars
  - 14th Regiment of Cossacks
- 14th Horse Artillery Division

== Commanders ==
- 18.10.1914—13.05.1915 : Ivan Erdélyi

== Commanders of the 1st Brigade ==
- 1880–1882: Alexander Kaulbars
