= Uzdowo =

- Village
- Location within Poland
- Coordinates: 53°20′N 20°6′E
- Country: Poland
- Voivodeship: Warmian-Masurian
- County: Działdowo
- Gmina: Działdowo
- Population: 770

Uzdowo [uzˈdɔvɔ] is a village in the administrative district of Gmina Działdowo, within Działdowo County, Warmian-Masurian Voivodeship, in northern Poland. It was formerly part of the German province of East Prussia.

== History ==
As a part of Prussia, the village entered the German Empire in 1871.

With the outbreak of the First World War and the August 1914 invasion of East Prussia by the Russian Empire, Usdau was occupied by units of the Imperial Russian Army. The town was recovered by the German 1st Division on the late morning of August 27 as the surviving occupiers withdrew. The town had been badly damaged by artillery fire and contained a large number of dead or injured Russian soldiers.

Following the German defeat in the Second World War, the village and the surrounding area were ceded to Poland.
