= 81st Infantry Division (Russian Empire) =

- 81-я пехотная дивизия
- Active: 1914–1918
- Country: Russian Empire
- Branch: Russian Imperial Army
- Role: Infantry
- Engagements: World War I; Battle of the Vistula River

The 81st Infantry Division (Russian: 81-я пехотная дивизия, 81-ya Pekhotnaya Diviziya) was an infantry formation of the Russian Imperial Army.

== Organization ==
- 1st Brigade
  - 321st Infantry Regiment
  - 322nd Infantry Regiment
- 2nd Brigade
  - 323rd Infantry Regiment
  - 324th Infantry Regiment
