= 79th Infantry Division (Russian Empire) =

- 79-я пехотная дивизия
- Active: 1914–1918
- Country: Russian Empire
- Branch: Russian Imperial Army
- Role: Infantry
- Engagements: World War I; Battle of the Vistula River

The 79th Infantry Division (Russian: 79-я пехотная дивизия, 79-ya Pekhotnaya Diviziya) was an infantry formation of the Russian Imperial Army.

== Organization ==
- 1st Brigade
  - 313th Infantry Regiment
  - 314th Infantry Regiment
- 2nd Brigade
  - 315th Infantry Regiment
  - 316th Infantry Regiment
- 79th Artillery Brigade
