= 2nd Siberian Army Corps =

- Country: Russian Empire
- Allegiance: Imperial Russian Army
- Engagements: Russo-Japanese War; World War I; Battle of Łódź (1914)

Commanders
- Notable commanders: Alexander Kaulbars Georgii Stackelberg Mikhail Zasulich Vladmir Vasilyevich Smirnov Radko Dimitriev

The 2nd Siberian Army Corps was an Army corps in the Imperial Russian Army.

== Composition ==
1905:

- 6th Siberian Rifle Division
- 8th Siberian Rifle Division

1914:

- 4th Siberian Rifle Division
- 5th Siberian Rifle Division

== Part of ==
- 1st Manchurian Army: 1904-1906
- 10th Army: 1914
- 12th Army: 1914, 1915 - 1916, 1916 - 1917
- 3rd Army: 1915
- 2nd Army: 1916
- 5th Army: 1916
- 1st Army: 1916

== Commanders ==
- 1900-1901: Alexander Kaulbars
- 1901-1902: Georgii Stackelberg
- 1903-1906: Mikhail Zasulich
- 1906-1908: Vladimir Vasilyevich Smirnov
- June-October 1915: Radko Dimitriev
