= Caucasus Cavalry Division (Russian Empire) =

Division of Russian Imperial Army

- Кавказская кавалерийская дивизия
- Active: 1914
- Country: Russian Empire
- Branch: Russian Imperial Army
- Role: Cavalry
- Engagements: World War I; Battle of Łódź (1914)

The Caucasus Cavalry Division (Russian: Кавказская кавалерийская дивизия, Kavkazskaya Kavaleriiskaya Diviziya) was a cavalry formation of the Russian Imperial Army.

== Organization ==
=== 1914 ===
- 1st Brigade (Tiflis)
  - 16th Dragoon Tver his Imperial Highness the Heir Tsarevich Regiment
  - 17th Dragoon Regiment, his Majesty the Nizhny Novgorod
- 2 Brigade (Tiflis)
  - 18th Dragoon Seversky King Christian IX the Danish Regiment
  - 1-St Sunzhensko-Vladikavkaz General Sleptsova Terek Cossack Army Regiment

Caucasian mountain equestrian Division

- 1-I Horse Mountain battery
- 2-I Horse Mountain battery

=== 1917 ===
- 1st Brigade
  - 16th Dragoon Regiment in Tver
  - 17th Dragoon Regiment of Nizhny Novgorod
- 2nd Brigade
- 18th Dragoon Regiment Severskiy
- 1-St Hopjorskij Regiment of the Kuban Cossack voisko

== Commanders ==
- 1883–1885: Zakharii Gul'batovich Chavchavadze
- 1885–1893: Ivane Amilakhvari
- 1893–1895: Tutolmin ivan fedorovitch
- 1903–1906: Louis Bonaparte (1864–1932)
- 1910–1915: Claes Charpentier
- 1915–1917: Sergei Belosselsky-Belozersky
- 1917: Anatoli Nazarov
- 1917: Aleksander Karnicki
