= Paul von Plehwe =

Russian general (1850–1916)

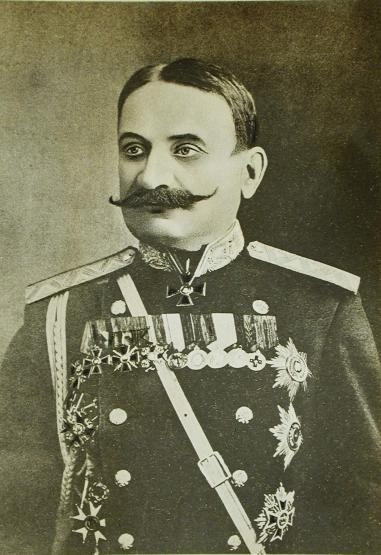
- Born: 30 June 1850
- Died: 28 March 1916 (aged 65)
- Allegiance: Russian Empire
- Branch: (Russian Empire) Russian Imperial Army
- Rank: General
- Commands: Moscow military district, 5th Army, Northern Front
- Conflicts: Russo-Turkish War; World War I

Paul von Plehwe (Russian: Па́вел Ада́мович (фон) Пле́ве, Pavel Adamovich (von) Pleve) (30 June 1850 – 28 March 1916), more commonly known as Pavel Plehve, was a Russian general of Baltic German descent who distinguished himself as a commander during World War I.

== Military career ==
After graduation from officer's cavalry school, Plehwe served in an uhlan regiment. In 1877, he graduated from the General Staff Academy. During the Russo-Turkish War, Plehwe served as a staff officer of the 13th corps, and after the war worked in the Bulgarian war ministry, returning to Russia in 1880.

During peacetime Plehwe raised through the ranks, commanding cavalry regiment (1890), Nicholas cavalry school (1895), 2nd cavalry division (1899) and Moscow military district (1909).

== World War I ==
He was given command over the Fifth Army which he led in the Battle of Galicia and the defence of Lodz. The following year he switched command to the new Twelfth Army, which he led in the Second Battle of the Masurian Lakes in February 1915 (where the Russian Tenth Army was defeated by the Germans). He subsequently returned to command of Fifth Army and, briefly, commanded the northern sector of the Eastern Front. Plagued for years by poor health Plehwe was finally invalided out of the army in February 1916; he died later the same year.

Political offices
Preceded by Pyotr Parensov	Minister of War of Bulgaria; 3 April 1880 – 15 April 1880	Succeeded by Alexander Timler
