= 5th Army (Russian Empire) =

The Russian Fifth Army was a World War I Russian field army that fought on the Eastern Front.

== Action ==
The 5th Army saw action at the Battle of Rawa, (3–11 September 1914). Under the command of General Pavel Plehve, they advanced into a forty-mile gap in the Austrian line between the Austrian First and Fourth armies. The Austrian chief of staff, General Franz Conrad, ordered a general retreat: the Austrians fell back over one hundred miles and lost 350,000 men. The Germans then moved troops from the Prussian front to stop a potential Austrian collapse.

== Deployment ==
- Southwestern Front (July – September 1914)
- Northwestern Front (September 1914 – August 1915)
- Northern Front (August 1915 – early 1918)

Rank	Commander	Period(S)
General of Cavalry	Pavel Plehve	19.07.1914 – 14.01.1915; 8.06.1915 – 6.12.1915;
General of Infantry	Aleksey Czurin	14.01.1915 – 8.06.1915
General of Infantry	Vladislav Klembovsky	6.12.1915 – 30.01.1916
General of Infantry	Aleksey Kuropatkin	30.01.1916 – 6.02.1916
General of Cavalry	Vasily Gurko	21.02.1916 – 4.08.1916
General of Infantry	Władimir Slusarienko	acting temporarily in August 1916
General of Cavalry	Abram Dragomirov	14.08.1916 – 27.04.1917
General of Infantry	Yuri Danilov	29.04.1917 – 9.09.1917
Lieutenant General	Vasily Boldyrev	09.09.1917 – 13.11.1917
Lieutenant General	Panteleimon Sukhanov	13.11.1917 – 01.01.1918
Major General	Arthur Zulf	01.1918

== See also ==
- List of Russian armies in World War I
- List of Imperial Russian Army formations and units
