= Sergey Nelipovich =

Russian military historian (born 1963)

- Сергей Геннадиевич Нелипович
- Born: 5 April 1963 (age 63); Moscow, Soviet Union
- Occupation: Historian

Sergey Gennadyevich Nelipovich (Russian: Сергей Геннадиевич Нелипович, born 5 April 1963) is a Russian historian specialising in the military history of Russia and international relations in the First World War. He is a candidate of Historical sciences and a senior researcher at the Institute of Russian History of the Russian Academy of Sciences. He is the author of many monographs, articles and publications.

== Main monographs ==
- Кровавый октябрь 1914 года [Bloody October 1914] (in Russian). 2013. ISBN 978-5-902073-95-6.
- Союз двуглавых орлов. Русско-австрийский военный альянс второй четверти XVIII в. [The Union of Double-Headed Eagles. Russian-Austrian military alliance of the second quarter of the 18th century.] (in Russian). 2010. ISBN 978-5-8129-0100-4.
- Русский фронт Первой мировой войны. Потери сторон. 1915 [Russian Front of the First World War. Casualties of the Sides. 1915] (in Russian). 2022. ISBN 978-5-91791-447-3.
- Русский фронт Первой мировой войны. Потери сторон. 1914 [Russian Front of the First World War. Casualties of the Sides. 1914] (in Russian). 2019. ISBN 978-5-91791-340-7.
- Лодзинская кампания 1914 года [Lodz Campaign 1914] (in Russian). 2021. ISBN 978-5-91791-387-2.
- Борьба за Галицию: сражения от Сана до Карпат в августе-октябре 1914 г. [The Struggle for Galicia: Battles from the San to the Carpathians in August–October 1914] (in Russian). 2021. ISBN 978-5-91791-420-6.
- Борьба за Галицию: сражения от Сана до Карпат в августе-октябре 1914 г. [The Struggle for Galicia: Battles from the San to the Carpathians in August–October 1914] (in Russian). 2020. ISBN 978-5-91791-381-0.
- Два похода. Борьба за Восточную Пруссию в августе-октябре 1914 года [Two Campaigns. The Fight for East Prussia in August-October 1914] (in Russian). 2020. ISBN 978-5-91791-376-6.
- Наш восемнадцатый век [Our eighteenth century] (in Russian). 2014. ISBN 978-5-90450-854-8.
