= 2nd Siberian Rifle Division =

2nd Siberian Division
- 2-я Сибирская стрелковая дивизия
- Active: 1883–1918
- Country: Russian Empire
- Branch: Russian Imperial Army
- Role: Infantry

The 2nd Siberian Rifle Division was an infantry formation of the Russian Imperial Army.

== History ==
The division was first formed as the 2nd East Siberian Rifle Brigade in 1883. In 1904 it was expanded into the 2nd East Siberian Rifle Division. The division fought in the Russo-Japanese War. The division was redesignated the 2nd Siberian Rifle Division in 1910.

In 1914, before the outbreak of World War I, the division's headquarters was located at Razdolnoe. Its 1st Brigade, with the 5th (Nikolsk-Ussuriski) and 6th (Novokievskoe) Siberian Rifle Regiments, was also located at Razdolnoe and its 2nd Brigade, with the 7th (Novokievskoe) and 8th (Barabash) Siberian Rifle Regiments, was headquartered at Novokiyevskoye. The division was part of the 1st Siberian Army Corps.

The division was disbanded in 1918.

== Organization ==
- 1st Brigade
  - 5th Siberian Rifle Regiment
  - 6th Siberian Rifle Regiment
- 2nd Brigade
  - 7th Siberian Rifle Regiment
  - 8th Siberian Rifle Regiment
- 2nd Siberian Rifle Artillery Brigade
