= 5th Siberian Rifle Division =

- 5-я Сибирская стрелковая дивизия
- Active: 1895–1918
- Country: Russian Empire
- Branch: (Russian Empire) Imperial Russian Army
- Role: Infantry
- Part of: 2nd Siberian Army Corps
- Garrison/HQ: Berezovka, near Verkhneudinsk
- Engagements: Boxer Rebellion; Russo-Japanese War; World War I

The 5th Siberian Rifle Division (Russian: 5-я Сибирская стрелковая дивизия; 5-ya Sibirskaya Strelkovaya Diviziya) was an infantry unit of the Imperial Russian Army. The division was formed in 1904 from a brigade, fighting in the Russo-Japanese War and World War I.

== History ==
The 5th Division traced its lineage back to the 1895 formation of the 1st East Siberian Line Brigade. On 4 July 1900 it was redesignated the 5th East Siberian Rifle Brigade, consisting of the 17th, 18th, 19th, and 20th East Siberian Rifle Regiments. The brigade fought in Russian invasion of Manchuria during the Boxer Rebellion. The 17th and 18th Regiments received cap badges for the Sungari Campaign, and the 20th received a cap badge for "distinction in 1900." On 10 February 1904 it was upgraded into the 5th East Siberian Rifle Division. The division fought in the Russo-Japanese War as part of the 2nd Siberian Army Corps. Between 17 and 18 July 1904, it participated in the Battle of Kangualin.

In 1910, it became the 5th Siberian Rifle Division and its regiments became Siberian Rifle Regiments instead of East Siberian Rifle Regiments. In 1914, the division's headquarters were located at Berezovka, near Verkhneudinsk (now the Vagzhanova microdistrict of Ulan-Ude). Its 1st Brigade at Berezovka consisted of the 17th and 18th Siberian Rifle Regiments, both also at Berezovka. Its 2nd Brigade at Troitskosavsk included the 19th and 20th Regiments, located at Berezovka and Troitskosavsk, respectively. The 5th Siberian Rifle Artillery Brigade with two battalions at Berezovka provided artillery support for the division. The division fought in World War I. The division was disbanded in 1918 after the collapse of the Imperial Russian Army.

== Commanders ==
The following officers commanded the division.

- Major General (promoted to Lieutenant General 18 July 1904) Konstantin Alexeyev (3 July 1899 – 21 June 1905)
- Major General Pyotr Polkovnikov (16 July 1905 – 27 February 1906)
- Major General (promoted to Lieutenant General 6 December 1907) Eris-khan Aliyev (16 May 1906 – 14 August 1908)
- Major General Fyodor Voloshinov (23 October 1908 – 9 April 1910)
- Lieutenant General Genrikh Liliyental (13 February 1913 – after 1 April 1914)
- Major General Yevgeny Milodanovich (3 August 1915 – 19 September 1917)
