= Galich–Lvov operation =

Russian operation during the Battle of Galicia in 1914

- Part of the Battle of Galicia on the Eastern Front (World War I)
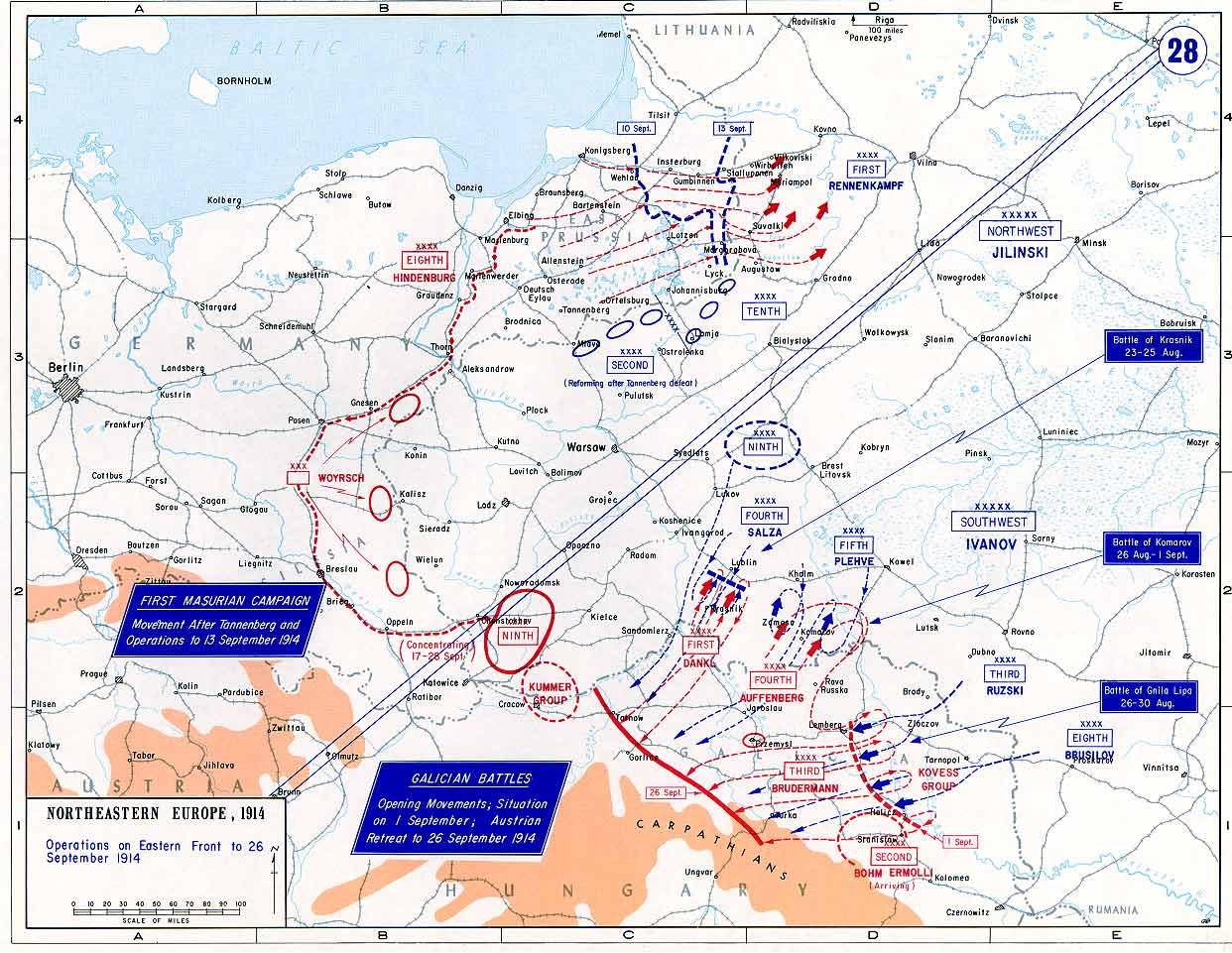
- Russian advances during the Battle of Galicia, August–September 1914
Date	18 August – 4 September 1914 (5–22 August 1914 O.S.)
Location	Eastern Galicia, Austria-Hungary
Result	Russian victory
Territorial changes	Russian capture of Lemberg/Lvov and Galich/Halicz

Belligerents
Russia	Austria-Hungary

Commanders and leaders
Nikolai Ivanov; Mikhail Alekseyev; Nikolai Ruzsky; Aleksei Brusilov	Archduke Friedrich, Duke of Teschen; Franz Conrad von Hötzendorf; Rudolf von Brudermann

Units involved
Southwestern Front; 3rd Army; 8th Army	Austro-Hungarian Army; 3rd Army elements of the 2nd Army

The Galich–Lvov operation (Russian: Галич-Львовская операция, romanized: Galich-Lvovskaya operatsiya) was a Russian offensive operation during the opening phase of the Battle of Galicia on the Eastern Front of the First World War. It was conducted by the Russian 3rd Army under Nikolai Ruzsky and the Russian 8th Army under Aleksei Brusilov against Austro-Hungarian forces in eastern Galicia. The operation began on 18–19 August 1914 and ended with the Russian capture of Lemberg/Lvov on 3 September and Galich/Halicz on 4 September.

== Background ==
The Battle of Galicia opened in August 1914 with two major Russian operations: the Lublin–Kholm operation on the northern sector of the front and the Galich–Lvov operation on the southern sector. The Russian Southwestern Front, commanded by Nikolai Ivanov with Mikhail Alekseyev as chief of staff, sought to defeat the Austro-Hungarian armies in Galicia before they could reorganize behind the San. Lemberg was one of Austria-Hungary's principal eastern administrative and military centres.

Brusilov's 8th Army began advancing on 18 August 1914, followed by Ruzsky's 3rd Army on 19 August. Early Russian advances forced Austro-Hungarian formations to retreat toward successive defensive positions while the Austro-Hungarian high command attempted to preserve cohesion on its eastern flank.

== Operation ==
From 26 to 28 August 1914, the Russian 3rd Army engaged the Austro-Hungarian 3rd Army under Rudolf von Brudermann in the Battle of Złota Lipa. Austro-Hungarian formations were forced to withdraw after Russian pressure disrupted their alignment and threatened the cohesion of the eastern wing of the front.

The fighting continued from 29 August to 1 September during the Battle of Gnila Lipa. The Russian 3rd Army broke through the Austro-Hungarian front while Brusilov's 8th Army repelled counterattacks by elements of the Austro-Hungarian 2nd Army. The failure of the Austro-Hungarian counterattacks prevented the restoration of a stable defensive line east of Lemberg and forced a general withdrawal toward the Gorodok position.

Russian troops entered Lemberg on 3 September 1914. Galich was occupied the following day, completing the immediate objectives of the Galich–Lvov operation. The loss of both centres compelled the Austro-Hungarian command to redeploy formations from other sectors in an attempt to restore operational stability west of Lemberg.

== Aftermath ==
The Galich–Lvov operation formed one phase of the wider Russian victory in the Battle of Galicia. Following the fall of Lemberg, the Austro-Hungarian command launched the Gorodok counteroffensive on 5 September in an attempt to recover the initiative and stabilize the front. The broader campaign nevertheless continued to deteriorate for Austria-Hungary, leading to a general withdrawal behind the San and the Russian investment of Przemyśl.

Casualties for the Galich–Lvov operation are not usually separated from those of the wider Battle of Galicia. According to the Presidential Library, total losses during the broader campaign amounted to approximately 230,000 Russian casualties and approximately 360,000 Austro-Hungarian casualties, including around 120,000 prisoners.

== Bibliography ==
- Buttar, Prit (2014). Collision of Empires: The War on the Eastern Front in 1914. Oxford: Osprey Publishing. ISBN 978-1-78200-648-0.
- Österreichisches Bundesministerium für Heereswesen and Kriegsarchiv (1930). Österreich-Ungarns letzter Krieg 1914–1918 (in German). Vol. 1: Das Kriegsjahr 1914. Vienna: Verlag der Militärwissenschaftlichen Mitteilungen.
- Stone, Norman (1998) [1975]. The Eastern Front 1914–1917. Penguin Books. ISBN 978-0-14-026725-9.
- Wawro, Geoffrey (2014). A Mad Catastrophe: The Outbreak of World War I and the Collapse of the Habsburg Empire. New York: Basic Books. ISBN 978-0-465-02835-1.

== See also ==
- Battle of Galicia
- Battle of Złota Lipa
- Battle of Gnila Lipa
- Eastern Front (World War I)
- Russian occupation of Eastern Galicia, 1914–1915
