= Hnyla Lypa (disambiguation) =

Hnyla Lypa (Ukrainian: Гнила Липа, Polish: Gniła Lipa, Russian: Гнилая Липа, Gnilaya Lipa) is a river in Ukraine, a tributary of the Dniester river.

Hnyla Lypa may also refer to:

- Hnyla Lypa, right tributary of Zolota Lypa, Ukraine
- An alternative name of Lypa River, a left tributary of Styr River, Ukraine
- Hnyla Lypa Nature Reserve by Hnyla Lypa (Styr tributary), Volyn Oblast, Ukraine

== See also ==
- Battle of Gnila Lipa
