= Battle of Galicia =

Battle in World War I's Eastern Front

- Part of the Eastern Front during World War I
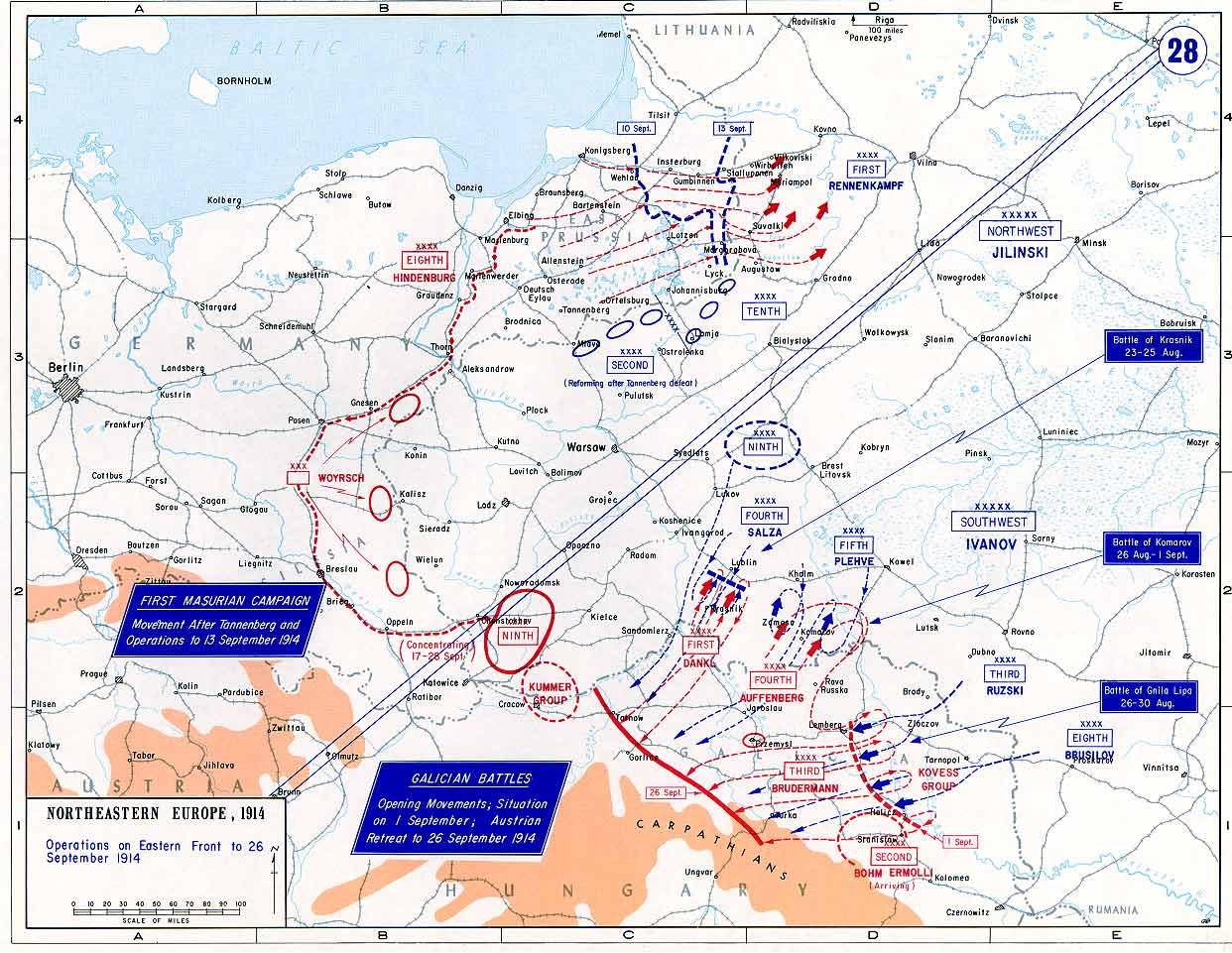
- Eastern Front, September 1914.
Date	23 August – 11 September 1914
Location	Lemberg, Galicia (modern-day Lviv, Ukraine) 49.8500°N 24.0167°E
Result	Russian victory Full results: 45%-50% of all Austrian manpower on the Eastern Front was destroyed, Russia had captured a large territory into the Kingdom of Hungary; Russia's victory forced Austria to withdraw troops from the Serbian front, which eventually helped the Serbs win the campaign; Creation of the General Government of Galicia and Bukovina
Territorial changes	Russian occupation of Eastern Galicia and Northern Bukovina

Belligerents
Russian Empire	Austria-Hungary

Commanders and leaders
Nikolai Ivanov; A. Y. von Saltza; Aleksei Evert; Pavel Plehve; Nikolai Ruzsky; Aleksei Brusilov	(Austria-Hungary) Archduke Friedrich (Austria-Hungary) Franz Conrad von Hötzendorf (Austria-Hungary) Viktor Dankl von Krasnik (Austria-Hungary) Moritz von Auffenberg (Austria-Hungary) Rudolf von Brudermann (Austria-Hungary) E. von Böhm-Ermolli (Austria-Hungary) H. K. von Kövessháza (Austria-Hungary) Heinrich von Kummer

Units involved
Southwestern Front: 3rd Army; 4th Army; 5th Army; 8th Army	(Austria-Hungary) 1st Army (Austria-Hungary) 3rd Army (Austria-Hungary) 4th Army (Austria-Hungary) Army group Kövess (Austria-Hungary) Army group Kummer

Strength
1,000,000 to 1,200,000	950,000

Casualties and losses
200,000–300,000: 40,000 captured	324,000–420,000: 100,000 dead; 220,000 wounded; 100,000–130,000 captured

The Battle of Galicia, also known as the Great Battle of Galicia, was a major battle between Russia and Austria-Hungary during the early stages of World War I in 1914. In the course of the battle, the Austro-Hungarian armies were severely defeated in several encounters and forced out of Galicia, while the Russians captured Lemberg (now Lviv) and, for approximately nine months, ruled Eastern Galicia until their defeat at Gorlice and Tarnów. The Battle of Galicia showed weaknesses of the Austro-Hungarian Army during that period and at the same time was one of the formidable victories of the Imperial Russian Army in the war.

== Background ==
When war came the Chief of the Austro-Hungarian General Staff Franz Conrad von Hötzendorf planned to launch an offensive into Russian Poland with his northern armies (the 1st and 4th). The Russians would far outnumber the Central Powers in the east (especially the Austro-Hungarian armies, which were Russia's primary target), Conrad believed that their best option was an early advance into southern Poland where the Russians would be concentrating their newly mobilized units.

Conrad knew that his German allies were committed to an offensive in the West to defeat the French in the first ten weeks of the war. Only the German 8th Army would be in the East, where they would stand on the defensive in East Prussia. However, their alliance with the French obliged the Russians to attack the Germans promptly, so substantial Russian forces would be sent to invade East Prussia. The Austro-Hungarian 1st and 4th Armies would advance into Poland without direct German support. By 23 August 1914 Conrad's 1st, 3rd, and 4th Armies were concentrated in Galicia along a front of 280 km (170 mi).

On 2 August Grand Duke Nicholas Nikolaevich, a second cousin of Emperor Nicholas II who had made his career in the army, was made Commander-in-Chief. He had an excellent reputation for training troops, but had never commanded a field army and was staggered by his unexpected elevation. The Russian 3rd, 4th, 5th, and 8th Armies were assigned to Galicia. The Russian war plan called for Nikolai Ivanov, the Russian commander of the Southwest Front, to counter an anticipated Austro-Hungarian offensive thrusting eastward from Lemberg. The 3rd and 8th Armies would mount an offensive into eastern Galicia. The Russians could bring 260 trains a day to their front, compared to the Austro-Hungarian's 152.

== Battles ==
The Russian operation had just begun; the Austro-Hungarian XI Corps was stationed on the Zbruch River and one Austro-Hungarian cavalry division, supported by infantry and artillery, decided to cover the Russians by breaking through the town where there was the 2nd consolidated Cossack division and several companies with machine guns. The Russians perfectly lined up the infantry positions, placing them in a thick chain before the main attack, while machine guns were placed on high ground so that the position of the Austro-Hungarian cavalry was completely shot through. The Austro-Hungarians, believing that numerical superiority guaranteed victory, rushed into battle without reconnaissance, machine-gun and artillery fire mowed down many Austro-Hungarians, and the matter ended with the Cossacks hitting the right flank where they chopped down the enemy's cavalry. The battle ended in a rout that convinced the Russian units that they were superior to the enemy in everything.

The Austro-Hungarian 1st Army under Viktor Dankl moved in the north towards Lublin. Dankl struck and drove back the Russian 4th Army, under Baron Zaltsa, in what would be known as the Battle of Kraśnik. Dankl's army was able to capture 6,000 prisoners.

To the right of Dankl the Austro-Hungarian 4th Army, aiming at Cholm, drove back the Russian 5th Army under Pavel Plehve in the Battle of Komarów, capturing 20,000 prisoners and inflicting heavy casualties. However, a planned Austro-Hungarian enveloping movement around the Russian army failed.

A counter battle between Russian and Austro-Hungarian troops, the fighting went on with varying success, but as a result, the Austro-Hungarians were forced to retreat, which later became an important part for the victory on Gnila Lipa.

As the Russians were being driven back along the northern front, the Austro-Hungarian 3rd Army and Army Group Kovess made a simultaneous advance against Ivanov's left wing. Along the southern front, Ivanov had the Russian 3rd Army under Nikolai Ruzsky and the Russian 8th Army under Aleksei Brusilov. Brusilov and Ruzsky routed the Austro-Hungarians so thoroughly that even though poor roads necessitated that the Russians halt for two days, the Austro-Hungarians could not regroup to halt the Russian drive. This attack became known as the Battle of Gnila Lipa.

The Russian army under the command of Brusilov was engaged in a defensive operation on the left flank of the Russians. The battle took place with the double superiority of the Austro-Hungarians in manpower and artillery, and ended with a complete victory of the Russians and the latter's transition to a counteroffensive. As Brusilov notes in his memoirs, "our losses were great, but much less than the huge losses of the Austrians".

With the entire 3rd Army and Kovess Group in full retreat, Conrad pulled forces away from the northern front which he believed had been sufficiently defeated. In fact, the Russians north of Lemberg were still a potential threat. Ivanov ordered Plehve's 5th Army to attack and drove the Austro-Hungarians back as they began to shift forces to the south in an engagement known as the Battle of Rava Ruska. The Austro-Hungarian 2nd Army was quickly recalled from Serbia, but it was too late and the entire Austro-Hungarian front collapsed in Galicia, and the Russians took control of Lemberg.

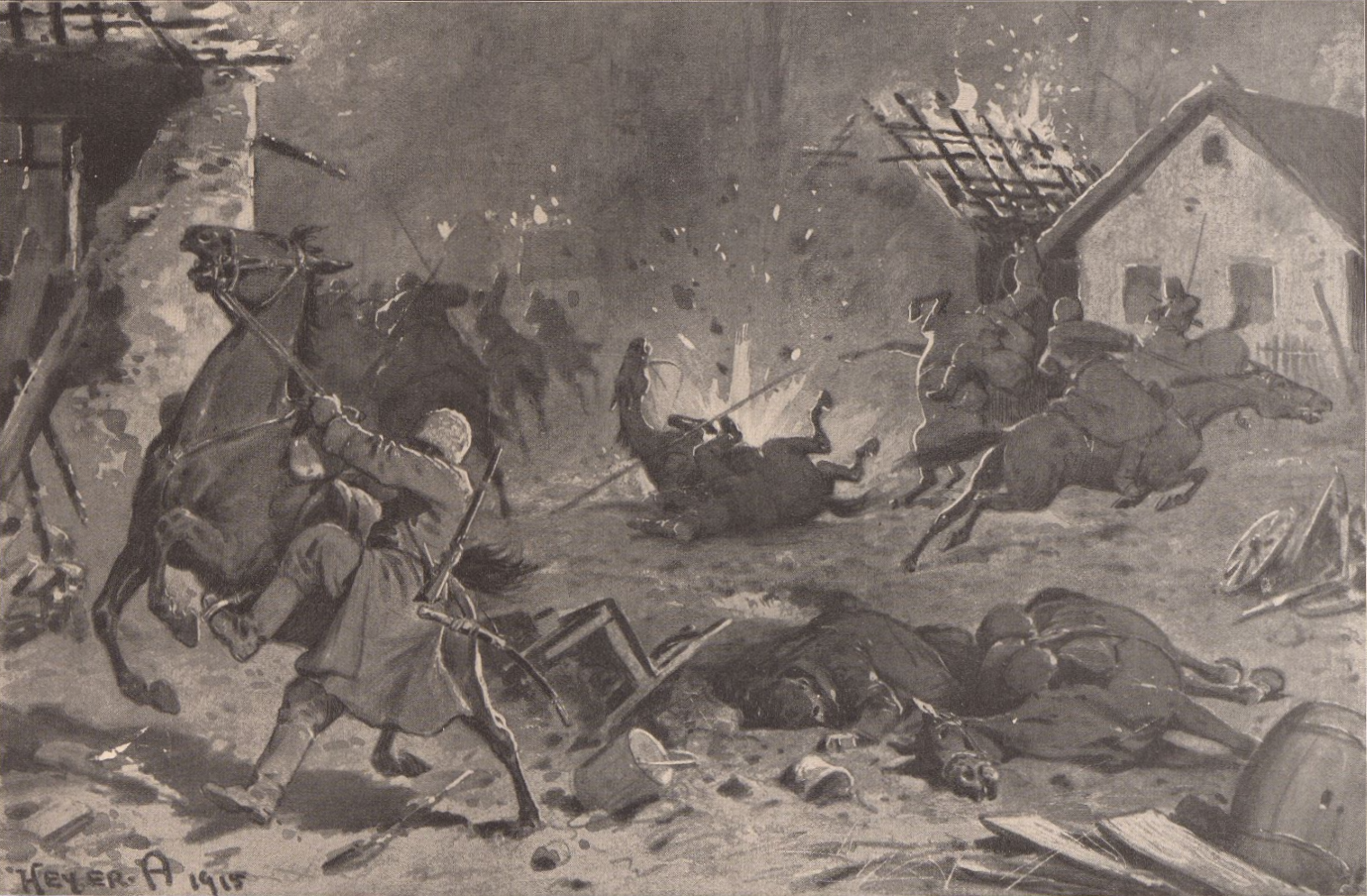
Destruction of a Russian cavalry detachment near Wieliczka, southeast of Krakow (painting by Arthur Heyer)

In early November, the Russians set a goal to reach the approaches of the Carpathian mountains, for this the Częstochowa operation began. The Russian offensive began with the Battle of Bexida, the army of the General Borevich began to retreat hastily under the Russian onslaught. Later, the Russians captured Dukla and strategically important Lupovsky Pass.

== Results ==
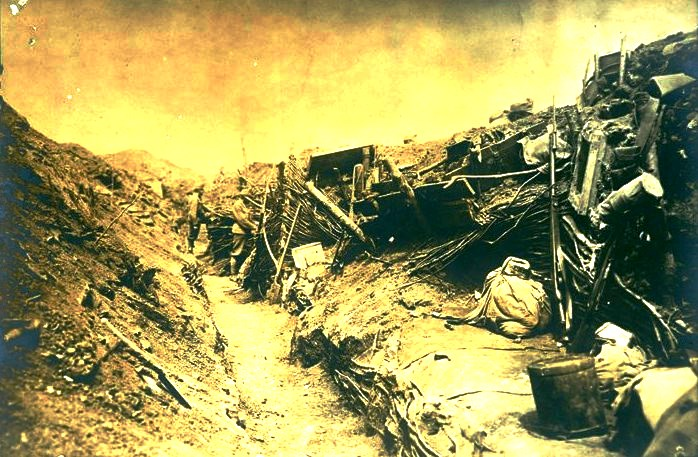
Destruction of an Austro-Hungarian trench following Russian bombardment.

Holger Herwig estimates Austro-Hungarian losses of 100,000 dead, 220,000 wounded and 100,000 captured. According to Prit Buttar, the Austro-Hungarian army lost 324,000 men in Galicia, including 130,000 as prisoners, while the Russians lost 225,000 men, of which 40,000 were captured. Other authors estimate 400,000 Austro-Hungarian losses, or "one-third of the Austro-Hungarian Army's combat effectives", and 250,000 for the Russians.

The Russians had pushed the front 100 miles (160 kilometers) into the Carpathian Mountains, completely surrounded the Austro-Hungarian fortress of Przemyśl and started a Siege of Przemyśl which lasted for over a hundred days. The battle severely damaged the Austro-Hungarian Army, killed a large portion of its trained officers, and crippled Austria-Hungary. Though the Russians had been utterly crushed at the Battle of Tannenberg, their victory at Lemberg prevented that defeat from fully taking its toll on Russian public opinion.

== Order of battle ==
=== Russian forces ===
Russian South-Western front. Commander-in-chief – Nikolai Ivanov, Chief of Staff – Mikhail Alekseyev

- 4th Army Commander – Anton von Saltza (replaced by Aleksei Evert after the battle of Krasnik).
  - Grenadiers Corps
  - 14th Army Corps
  - 16th Army Corps
- 5th Army Commander – Pavel Plehve
  - 5th Army Corps
  - 17th Army Corps
  - 19th Army Corps
  - 25th Army Corps
- 3rd Army Commander – Nikolai Ruzsky – Staff officers: Vladimir Dragomirov, Nikolay Dukhonin, Mikhail Bonch-Bruyevich
  - 9th Army Corps
  - 10th Army Corps
  - 11th Army Corps
  - 21st Army Corps
- 8th Army Commander – Aleksei Brusilov – Staff officers Anton Denikin (Quartermaster)
  - 7th Army Corps
  - 8th Army Corps
  - 14th Army Corps
  - 24th Army Corps

=== Austro-Hungarian forces ===
- Army group Kummer - Heinrich von Kummer
  - 7th Cavalry Division
  - Landsturm forces
- 1st Army Commander – Viktor Dankl von Krasnik
  - I Corps (Cracow) – 5th and 46th Infantry Divisions
  - V Corps Pressburg (Bratislava) – 14th, 33th and 37th Infantry Divisions
  - X Corps (Przemysl) – 2nd, 24th and 45th Infantry Divisions
  - 12th Infantry Division
  - 3rd Cavalry Division
  - 9th Cavalry Division
- 4th Army Commander – Moritz von Auffenberg
  - II Corps (Wien) – 4th, 13th and 25th Infantry Divisions
  - VI Corps (Kaschau) – 15th, 27th and 39th Infantry Divisions
  - IX Corps (Leitmeritz) – 10th and 26th Infantry Divisions
  - XVII Corps (formed on outbreak of war) – 19th Infantry Division
  - 6th Cavalry Division
  - 10th Cavalry Division
- 3rd Army Commander – Rudolf Brudermann
  - XI Corps (Lemberg) – 30th Infantry Division
  - XIV Corps (Innsbruck) – 3rd, 8th and 44th Infantry Division
  - 23rd Infantry Division
  - 41st Infantry Division
  - 2nd Cavalry Division
  - 4th Cavalry Division
- Army group Kövess (later part of the 2nd Army))
  - III Corps (Graz) – 6th, 28th and 22nd Infantry Divisions
  - XII Corps (Hermannstadt) – 16th, 35th and 38th Infantry Divisions
  - 11th Infantry Division
  - 43rd Infantry Division
  - 20th Infantry Division
  - 1st Cavalry Division
  - 5th Cavalry Division
  - 8th Cavalry Division

== See also ==
- Battle of Lwów (disambiguation), for other battles fought for the city of Lemberg

== Bibliography ==
- Брусилов, Алексей (2023). Мои воспоминания. Из царской армии в Красную. Moscow: Москва. ISBN 978-5-04-176827-0.
- Borisyuk, Andrey (2024). Забытая война. Россия в 1914-1918 [The forgotten war. Russia in 1914-1918] (in Russian). Moscow: Вече. ISBN 978-5-4484-5078-5.
- Buttar, P. (2014). Collision of Empires: The War on the Eastern Front in 1914. Osprey Publishing. ISBN 978-1472813183.
- Nikolai Golovin. Great battle for Galicia;
- Herwig, H. (2014). The First World War: Germany and Austria-Hungary 1914-1918 (2nd ed.). London: Bloomsbury Academic. ISBN 978-1-4725-1250-5.
- Oleynikov, Alexei (2016). Россия-щит Антанты [Russia-shield of the Entente] (in Russian). Foreword by Nikolai Starikov. St. Petersburg: Piter. ISBN 978-5-496-01795-4.
- Rady, Martyn (2023). The Habsburgs: To Rule the World'. Moscow: Альпина нон-Фикшн. ISBN 978-5-00139-266-8.
- Schindler, John R. (2015). Fall of the Double Eagle: the Battle for Galicia and the demise of Austria-Hungary. Herndon, Virginia: Potomac Books. ISBN 978-1-61234-765-3.
- Stone, David (2015). The Russian Army in the Great War: The Eastern Front, 1914-1917. Lawrence: University Press of Kansas. ISBN 9780700620951.
- Tuchman, Barbara, The Guns of August (1962)
- Tucker, Spencer, The Great War: 1914–18 (1998)
