= 176th Perevolochna Infantry Regiment =

- Active: 1877–1918
- Country: Russian Empire
- Branch: Imperial Russian Army
- Type: Infantry
- Size: Regiment
- Anniversaries: 26 November (feast day)
- Engagements: World War I: Battle of Gnila Lipa

Commanders
- Notable commanders: Mikhail Dmitriyevich Bonch-Bruyevich

The 176th Perevolochna Infantry Regiment (Russian: 176-й пехотный Переволоченский полк) was a reserve infantry regiment in the Imperial Russian Army that fought during World War I as part of the 44th Infantry Division.

== Origins ==
The regiment traced its seniority back to the formation of the 27th Reserve Infantry Battalion from a cadre of the Poltava Local Battalion on 31 July 1877. It was redesignated as the 64th Reserve Infantry Battalion (Cadre) on 10 October 1878, and granted an unadorned banner on 31 March 1880. The battalion received the designation Perevolochna Reserve Battalion on 25 March 1891, and expanded into the two battalion-189th Perevolochna Reserve Infantry Regiment on 1 December 1892. It was reorganized as the four battalion-176th Perevolochna Infantry Regiment on 1 January 1898.

== World War I ==
At the outbreak of World War I, the 176th Perevolochensky Regiment was part of the 21st Army Corps and quartered at Chernigov. Upon mobilisation, the regiment was immediately transferred to its winter barracks so that the summer camp could be used by the 316th Khvalinsky Regiment. At that time, the regiment was under the command of Mikhail Dmitriyevich Bonch-Bruyevich, who gave the troops a patriotic speech before marching them to the railway station at Kruty. Bonch-Bruyevich experienced some problems with maintaining discipline. However, he was lenient with a group of 100 soldiers who had gone AWOL and another group of drunken reservists who had tried to give a beating to Captain Kotsubinsky, the unpopular commanding officer of the 7th Company. The unit travelled via Kiev to Lutsk, whence it joined the 44th Infantry Division at Torgovitsy.

=== Engagements ===
- Battle of Gnila Lipa (26 - 30 August 1914)
