= Nikolai Ivanov (general) =

Russian general (1851–1919)

Nikolai Iudovich Ivanov
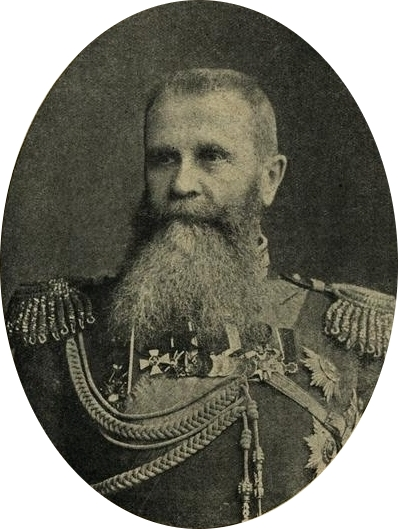
- General Nikolai Ivanov
- Born: 3 August [O.S. 22 July] 1851; Mosalsk, Kaluga Governorate, Russian Empire
- Died: 27 January 1919 (aged 67); Novocherkassk, Russian SFSR
- Military career
- Allegiance: Russian Empire; Russian Republic
- Branch: (Russian Empire) Imperial Russian Army (Russian Republic) White Army
- Service years: 1869–1919
- Rank: General of the Artillery
- Commands: 1st Army Corps (1905–1906); Kiev Military District (1908–1914); Southwestern Front (1914–1916); Petrograd Military District; Southern Army (White Army) (1918)
- Conflicts: Russo-Turkish War; Russo-Japanese War; Battle of Liaoyang; Battle of Mukden; World War I; Battle of Galicia; Battle of the Vistula River; Carpathian Front; First Battle of Przasnysz; Gorlice–Tarnów offensive; Great Retreat; Rovno offensive; General Ivanov's march on Petrograd; Russian Civil War; Civil War on the Don
- Awards: see below

Nikolai Iudovich Ivanov (Russian: Никола́й Иу́дович Ива́нов; 3 August [O.S. 22 July] 1851 – 27 January 1919) was a Russian artillery general in the Imperial Russian Army. In July 1914, Ivanov was given command of four armies in the Southwestern Front against the Austro-Hungarian army, winning a major battle of Galicia. During the Russian Revolution of March 1917, Tsar Nicholas II ordered Ivanov to suppress the revolutionaries but as promised reinforcements failed to come to his aid, he canceled the aborted mission. In 1917, he retired but a year later took command of the White Army. In 1919, Ivanov died of typhus in Southern Russia.

== Family ==
Ivanov's family origin was debatable, some sources say that Ivanov came from a noble family originated from the Kaluga Governorate, but other sources told that he was the son of a cantonist. Despite all of these sources about his family, the true identity of where his family originated from is still a mystery.

== Early life ==
Ivanov was born on 22 July 1851 (based on the old calendar at use in the Russian Empire at that time), in Mosalsk in the Kaluga Governorate. He attended the 2nd Cadet Corps and the Pavlovsky Cadet Corps in St. Petersburg at an early age, and graduated from the Mikhailovsky Artillery School in 1869, and served in the 3rd Grenadier Guards and artillery brigades. He first saw action during the Russo-Turkish War (1877–1878), and was promoted to colonel in mid August 1877. After which he subsequently remained in Romania to serve as an instructor to the Romanian Army. In late July 1884, he was commander of the 2nd Battalion of the Imperial Guards Artillery, and in early April 1890, was appointed commandant of the fortress artillery of Kronstadt. In mid-December 1899, he was selected to be an aide-de-camp to Grand Duke Michael. He also participated in the suppression of the Boxer Rebellion in China during the beginning of the century, after which he was promoted to lieutenant-general in early December 1901.

== Russo-Japanese War ==
General Ivanov participated in the Russo-Japanese War in 1904, he was appointed to the 1st Manchurian Army. In mid-July 1904, he was appointed commander of the Eastern Detachment, after its commander, Lieutenant General F. E. Keller was killed at the Battle of Motien Pass, and was later appointed to the 3rd Siberian Army Corps, and commanded the corps during retreating from Liaoyang after the battle ended. Later during the Battle of Shaho, he was ordered to bypass the left flank of the Japanese Army and repulse them back to Korea. After that, the Japanese retreated due to heavy resistance by the Russians. After that at Mukden, he distinguished himself during defending against the Japanese. After that brief success of his, he was awarded the Order of St. George both the 3rd and the 4th class for military distinction.

After the war, he became the commander of the Manchurian Army. In early November 1907, he became the commander of the 1st Army Corps. After that, he was appointed the chief of staff of the city of Kronstadt in mid-April of that year, and governor-general in November. Later that same year, he was appointed adjutant general. In mid April 1908, he was promoted to General of the Artillery; he was also appointed commander-in-chief of the Kiev Military District later in early December.

== World War I ==
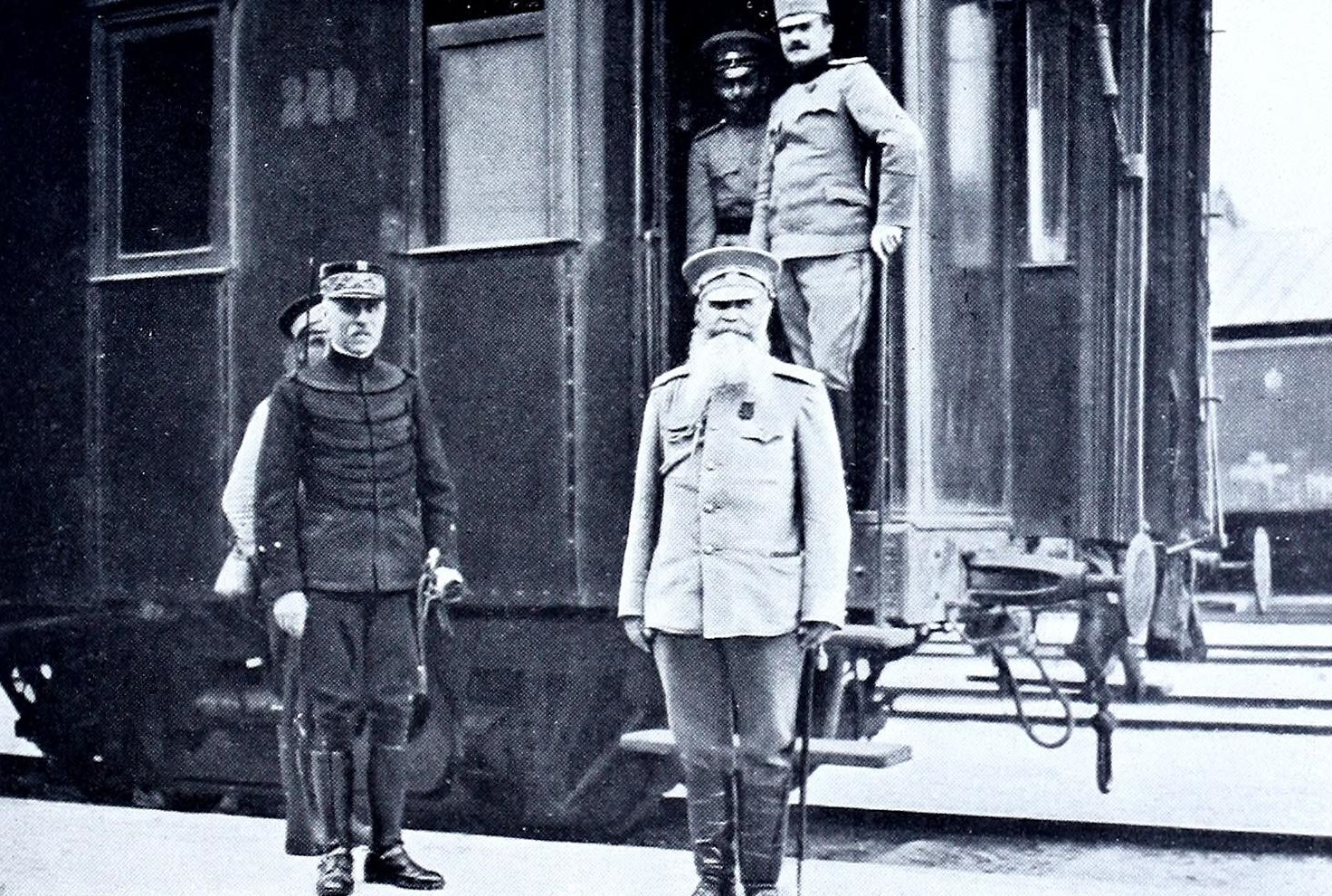
Ivanov with French military attache General Pierre de Laguiche, 18 August 1914

At the beginning of the First World War, Ivanov was appointed commander-in-chief of the Southwestern Front. At first, he together with the aged general Saltza suffered a minor defeat at Kraśnik, and Plehve with Evert lost the battle of Komarów; but success came next when his Russians made good progress into Austrian Galicia by winning the battles of Gnila Lipa and Rawa with the Russian casualties of about 200,000, the Austrians having roughly twice the casualties, including thousands of POWs. For the huge successes at the front, he was awarded the Order of St. Vladimir, 1st class with swords, and the Order of St, George of the 2nd degree, being three of the only generals that were awarded this high decoration, the other two generals being General Nikolai Ruzsky and Nikolai Yudenich. During the battle at the Vistula River, he with his Southwestern Front armies (4th Army and the 9th Army), together with the Northwestern Front commander-in-chief General Ruzsky with his armies (2nd Army and the 5th Army) from the North. In the matter of a month, General Ivanov and General Ruzsky's troops successfully repulsed the German advance, taking about a hundred kilometres of land. Later on, General Ivanov commanded an operation towards Kraków, it was successful at first, but was later ordered to retreat, ending the initial success.

In early 1915, General Ivanov gained approval of the Stavka to launch an offensive towards Hungary, but the offensive was disturbed by the Germans in Poland. Furthermore, the Austro-German forces launched an offensive in southern Poland. During the battle, the Russians suffered casualties up to 350 thousand men, and the Russians were pushed out of Galicia, starting the Russian Great Retreat. General Ivanov repeatedly showed examples of poor leadership of the troops and indecisiveness, much like many other Russian generals at that time. Most particularly, he and the General Radko Dimitriev (commander of the 3rd Army) didn't make any effort to strengthen the 3rd Army, which the Austro-German forces inflicted the main blow at and nearly wiping the army.

Later in June, General Ivanov ordered General Nikolai Khodorovich, commander-in-chief of the Kiev Military District, to take 1 in a 1000 local German civilians as hostages, and imprison them for the rest of the war. General Ivanov also prescribed to requisition that all the German hostages could only have a small portion of food of all the supplies they had got, and the hostages were settled in a highly secured residence. And if any hostages didn't follow the orders, they would be met with death penalty.

Later at the end of 1915, he conducted a failed operation by the 11th Army against the enemy's forces. And in March 1916, he was replaced by General Aleksei Brusilov as the commander-in-chief of the Southwestern Front, he was then appointed a member of the State Council, and was made adjutant to tsar Nicholas II himself. General Brusilov recalled that, when he arrived and accepted the post, General Ivanov burst into tears and said that he couldn't understand why he was to be replaced. General Brusilov assumed that it was due to the fact that General Ivanov was too passive, who believed that the front couldn't succeed.

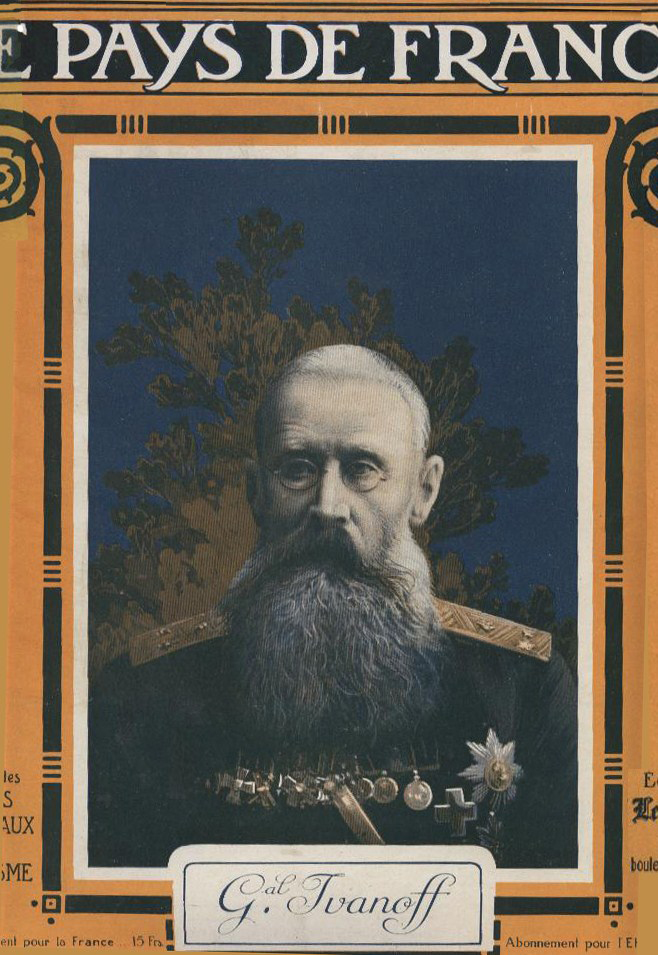
General Ivanov in a Le Pays de France (1916)

General Ivanov, with his loyalty towards the tsar and surprisingly the tsarina Alexandra Feodorovna and the mystic Rasputin as well, he enjoyed great confidence and reputation from the royal family. After General Mikhail Alekseyev was appointed chief of staff to the supreme commander-in-chief in mid 1915, which was the tsar himself, the tsarina wrote a letter to her husband, advising him not to let Alekseyev be the only person in charge of the Stavka and advised him to let Ivanov to assist him, saying that:

You will be more relaxed, and Alekseyev will not bear one responsibility.

Further actions showed that it was Ivanov was the mastermind behind Alekseyev, who was not trusted by the tsarina. In return, Ivanov was treated very well by Nicholas. Later on, the tsar wrote to his wife:

I am very glad to see old Ivanov. Fortunately, he grumbled less than ordinary. He asked you to send him your new photo; please do it - it will calm the glorious old man

Since September 1915, the tsarina had sent many letters to her husband, exerting pressure on him in order to summon General Ivanov back from the front to be at the post of Minister of War. The tsar later accepted it in March and summoned the general to the headquarters to be the tsar's secondment person. By the end of 1916, the tsarina launched a series of letters against General Alekseyev, Ivanov joined her by informing the situations of the Stavka and reported it to Alekseyev.

=== February Revolution ===
On 27 February (12 March) 1917, the February Revolution broke out in Russia, and was centered in Petrograd, the capital. General Alekseyev proposed to send a detachment by its commander with full power, to restore order in the capital. The tsar then ordered to allocate an infantry and cavalry brigade from the Northern and Western Fronts, and appointed Ivanov as the head of the general-adjutants and commander-in-chief of the Petrograd Military District, replacing Lieutenant-General Sergei Khabalov. Later on, the tsar ordered him to take command of the St. George Battalion in Tsarskoye Selo to ensure the royal family's safety. There was also a speech of the Stavka about strengthening the Petrograd Garrison by allocating "strong regiments" from the front back to the capital. Later, when the soldiers and police loyal to the Imperial Government surrendered to the revolutionaries, Minister of War General Mikhail Belyaev declared Petrograd a stage of siege, and military operation against the revolutionaries in the capital had begun.

General Alekseyev ordered Northern Front commander-in-chief General Yuri Danilov to send Ivanov two infantry and two cavalry regiments, reinforced by a machine-gun team:

The Emperor ordered the Adjutant-General Ivanov to be appointed Commander-in-Chief of the Petrograd Military District. At his disposal, with the possible haste to send from the troops of the Northern Front to Petrograd two cavalry regiments, possibly from the reserves of the 15th Cavalry Division, two infantry regiments of the most durable, reliable, one machine-gun Colt for the St. George Battalion, . It is necessary to appoint strong generals, since, apparently, General Khabalov has become confused, and at the disposal of General Ivanov it is necessary to give reliable, orderly and courageous assistants. The same strength will come from the Western Front ...

The Western Front informed General Alekseyev about dispatching the 34th Sevsky and 36th Orlovsky Infantry Regiments, the 2nd Hussar Pavlograd and the 2nd Don Cossack Regiments during February 28 and March 2. The Northern Front singled out the 67th and 68th Infantry Regiments, the 15th Ulansky Tatar and the 3rd Ural Cossack regiments.

General Ivanov is described by Solzhenitsyn of being reluctant to obey his orders by the Tsar to restore order in Petrograd and he delayed the dispatch of troops assigned to him for this purpose. In any case, “he [Ivanov] did not even reach the city.”

== Russian Civil War ==
After the October Revolution, he joined the White movement in southern Russia. In October 1918, he agreed to the invitation of Pyotr Krasnov to take command of the Southern Army. In the autumn of 1918, it numbered more than 20,000 troops, of which there were about 3,000 at the front. Parts of the army operating in the Voronezh and Tsaritsyn areas suffered heavy losses. In February–March 1919, they were reformed and became part of the 6th Infantry Division of the Armed Forces of South Russia.

Nikolai Ivanov died of typhus on 27 January 1919 in Novocherkassk.

== Honors ==
- Order of St. George, 4th class
- Order of St. George, 3rd class
- Order of St. George, 2nd class
- Order of St Vladimir, 1st class
- Order of St. Stanislaus 1st degree
- Order of St. Anne 1st degree
- , Order of St. Alexander Nevsky
- Order of the White Eagle
- Gold Sword for Bravery
