= 21st Army Corps (Russian Empire) =

Russian army corps headquartered in Kiev

- Country: Russian Empire
- Allegiance: Imperial Russian Army
- Engagements: World War I; Gorlice–Tarnów Offensive

The 21st Army Corps was an Army corps in the Imperial Russian Army. Their headquarters are in Kiev.

== Composition ==
- 33rd Infantry Division
- 44th Infantry Division

== Part of ==
- 3rd Army: 1914 - 1915
- 8th Army: 1915
- 2nd Army: 1915
- 5th Army: 1915 - 1916
- 12th Army: 1916 - 1917
- 4th Army: 1917

== Commanders ==
- 1906-1909: Nikolai Ruzsky
- 1914-1915: Yakov Schkinsky
- sept 1917: Nikolai Bredov
