= 12th Hungarian Infantry Regiment =

- Ungarisches Infanterie-Regiment Nr. 12
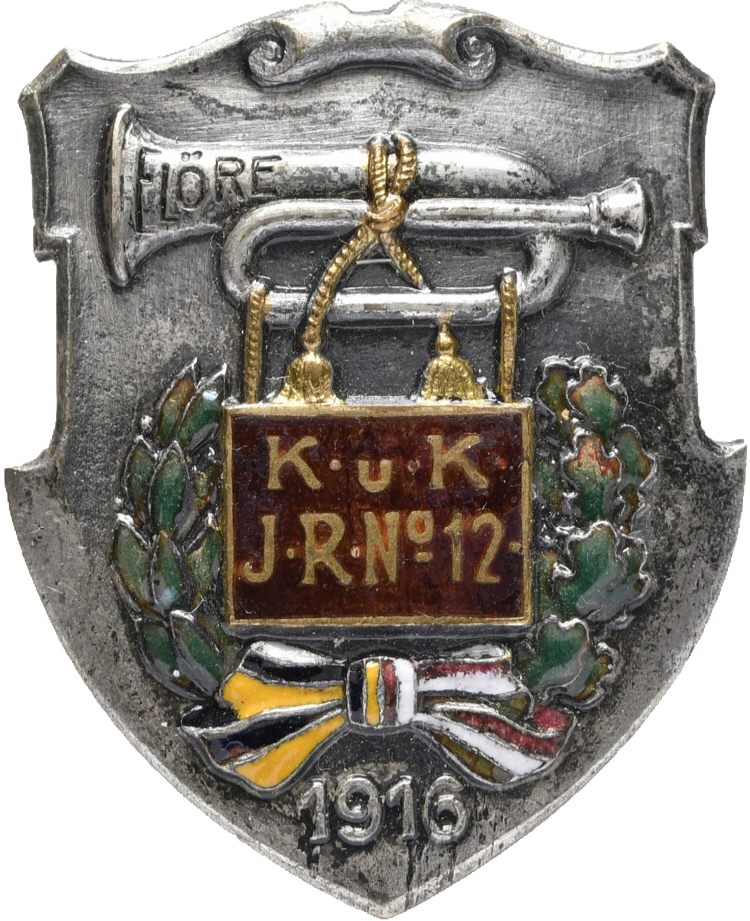
- Active: 1702 – 1918
- Country: Holy Roman Empire (1702-1806); Austria (1806-1867); Austria-Hungary (1867-1918)
- Branch: Army of the Holy Roman Empire (1702-1806); Imperial Austrian Army (1806–1867); Austro-Hungarian Army (1867-1918)
- Role: Infantry
- Size: Regiment
- Engagements: Seven Years' War; Napoleonic Wars; Hungarian Revolution of 1848; Austro-Prussian War; World War I: Battle of Galicia; Brusilov Offensive; Battle of Lutsk; Italian Front; Battles of the Isonzo

The 12th Hungarian Infantry Regiment was a regiment which served in the armies of the Holy Roman Empire, the Austrian Empire, and the Austro-Hungarian Empire.

== History ==
The regiment was formed in 1702.

The regiment participated in numerous conflicts including the Seven Years' War, the Napoleonic Wars, the Hungarian Revolution of 1848, the Austro-Prussian War and World War I.

=== World War I ===
At the outset of World War I, 58% of the regiment's soldiers were Hungarian, 31% were Slovak, while the last 11% were of another ethnicity. During the Battle of Lutsk, the regiment engaged Russian forces where it, along with other Austro-Hungarian units, suffered heavy casualties. The regiment also participated in battles on the Italian Front. The regiment was disbanded in 1918.
