= Nikolai Ruzsky =

Russian general (1854–1918)

Nikolai Vladimirovich Ruzsky
- Никола́й Влади́мирович Ру́зский
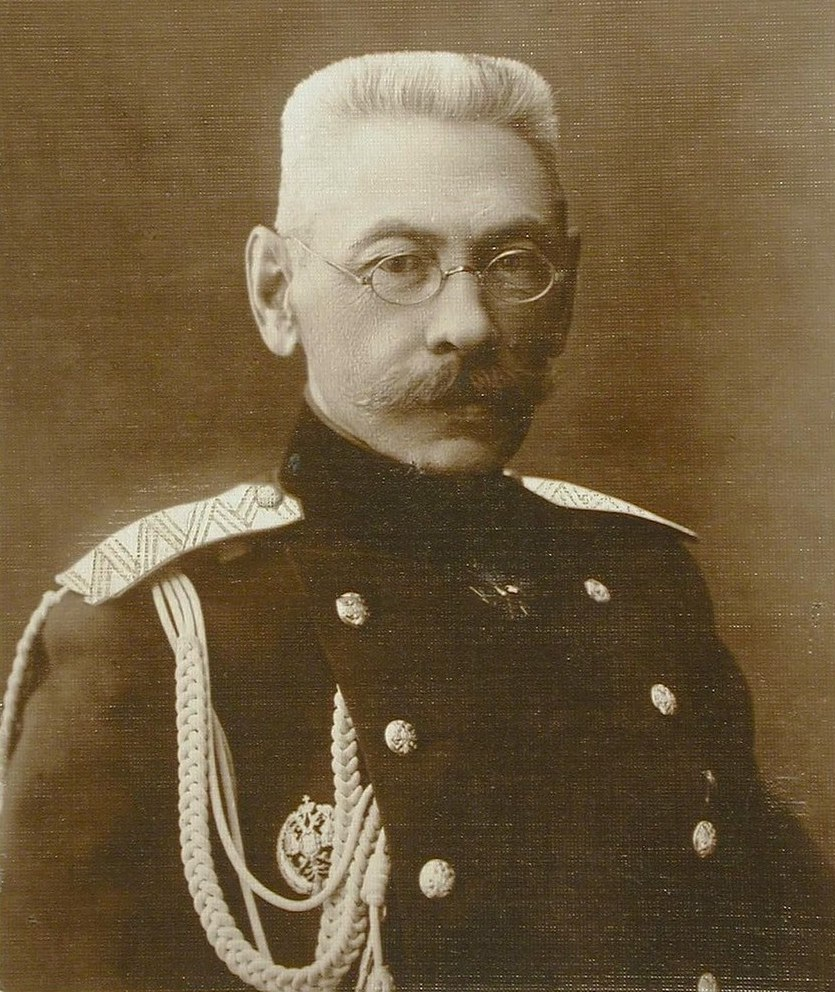
- Born: 18 March [O.S. 6 March] 1854; Russian Empire
- Died: 18 October 1918 (aged 64); Pyatigorsk, Russian SFSR
- Alma mater: Konstantinovsky Military College, 1872–1876
- Spouse: Zinovia Aleksandrovna Borezovsky (m. 1883)
- Children: 3
- Military career
- Allegiance: Russian Empire
- Branch: Imperial Russian Army
- Service years: 1872–1918
- Rank: General of the Infantry
- Nickname: Conqueror of Galicia
- Commands: Second Manchurian Army (1904–1905); Kiev Military District (1896–1902); Third Army (1914); Northwestern Front (1914–1915); Sixth Army (1915); Northern Front (1915–1916)
- Conflicts: Russo-Turkish War; Russo-Japanese War; World War I; Battle of Lemberg; Battle of Gnila Lipa; Battle of Łódź; Battle of the Vistula River; First Battle of Przasnysz
- Awards: See below

Nikolai Vladimirovich Ruzsky (Russian: Никола́й Влади́мирович Ру́зский; 18 March [O.S. 6 March] 1854 – October 18, 1918) was a Russian general, member of the state and military councils, best known for his role in World War I and the abdication of Tsar Nicholas II.

== Early life ==
Nikolai Vladimirovich Ruzsky was born in the Russian Empire on March 6, 1854, into a family of nobility from the Kaluga Governorate. The Ruzsky family's origins trace back to the mayor of the town of Ruza near Moscow during the late 1700s, Aleksei Mikhailovich Lermontov (the Ruzsky family was of the Ostrozhnikovskaya line of the Lermontov family). His father, Vladimir Dmitriyevich, was an official in the 12th Grade. His father died when Ruzsky was a year old and he was put under auspices by the Moscow Custodian Council.

== Early career ==
In 1870, Ruzsky graduated from the Cadet Corps at first class. In 1872, he graduated from the Konstantinovsky Artillery School at first class. In 1877, he participated in the Russo-Turkish War, and was wounded when taking a fortress in Gorni Dubnik. For courage, he was awarded the Order of St. Anna of the 4th degree with the inscription "For bravery". In July 1878, he attended a reserve battalion in preparation of attending the Nikolayev Academy of General Staff. Ruzsky graduated in 1881, in the first category. During his training in the academy, his teachers were all future ministers of war of future General Aleksey Kuropatkin, Vladimir Sukhomlinov and Aleksandr Roediger, all under the leadership of the prominent general, Mikhail Dragomirov. In December 1881, he was appointed the assistant to the senior adjutant of the Kazan Military District.

In 1884, he married a daughter of a retired officer, Zinovia Aleksandrovna Borezovsky, and they together had three children.

From March 1882 to November 1887, Ruzsky became the senior adjutant of the headquarter of the Kiev Military District. From 1882 to 1896, he became chief-of-staff to numerous divisions, including the 11th Cavalry Division, the 32nd Infantry Division and the 151st Infantry Pyatigorsk Regiment. In 1896, he became the district quartermaster of the Kiev Military District headquarter. In April 1904, he was appointed the chief-of-staff of the Vilno Military District. During his service in the military district, he enjoyed great reputation and respects from his fellow officers.

=== Russo-Japanese War ===
In the following years, he participated in Russo-Japanese War, in which he commanded the 2nd Manchurian Army. He participated in the battles at Sandepu and Mukden. In the war, he was noticed by fellow officers as one of the best generals and valuable workers in the army. While retreating from Mukden, General Ruzsky was in the rear of the army and was injured from falling off a horse, but he remained in the army.

After the war in 1906, he participated in the development of the "Regulations on-field command and control of troops in wartime" organisation. From May 1907 on, he was a member in the Supreme Military Criminal Court. He investigated the case of the surrender in Port Arthur. In 1909, he was appointed the commander of the 21st Army Corps, but soon was deducted due to poor health.

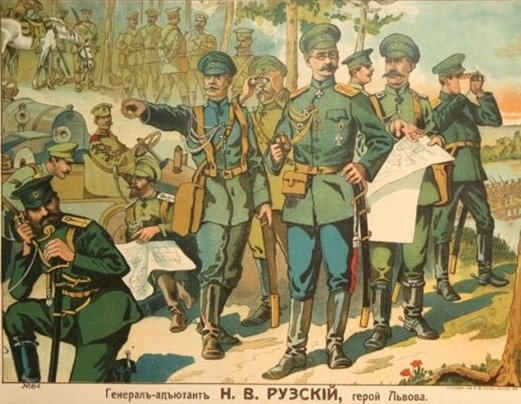
General Nikolai Ruzsky in the army (the tallest man and the only one in the group that wore glasses)

In December 1909, General Ruzsky became a member of the Ministry of War, and was involved in the development of charters and manuals, and was one of the authors of the Field Regulations of 1912. In February 1912, General Ruzsky was again appointed to the Kiev Military District, this time as the assistant commander of the troops in the district. According to the plans of war with Germany and Austria-Hungary, commander of the troops of the Kiev Military District, General Nikolai Ivanov was to be the appointed the commander-in-chief of the army in the Southwestern Front, and General Ruzsky, the commander of army, would be ordered to form the basis of the Kiev Military District.

== World War I ==
From mid-July to early September, General Ruzsky was in command of the Third Army. In the beginning, despite receiving information about an Austro-Hungarian offensive in Lublin and Holm, he still preserved the offensive against Lemberg. For the battles against the Austrians, and above all, his participation at Lemberg, he was awarded the Order of St. George both the 4th and the 3rd degree (VP in August 1914). And the for his participation in the Invasion of Galicia, he was again awarded the Order of St. George, this time the 2nd degree (VP in October 1914), becoming one of the top three generals (other being General Nikolai Ivanov and Nikolai Yudenich). General Ruzsky gained the name, the "Conqueror of Galicia", and he also gained great public reputation back in Russia, even his opposition circles.

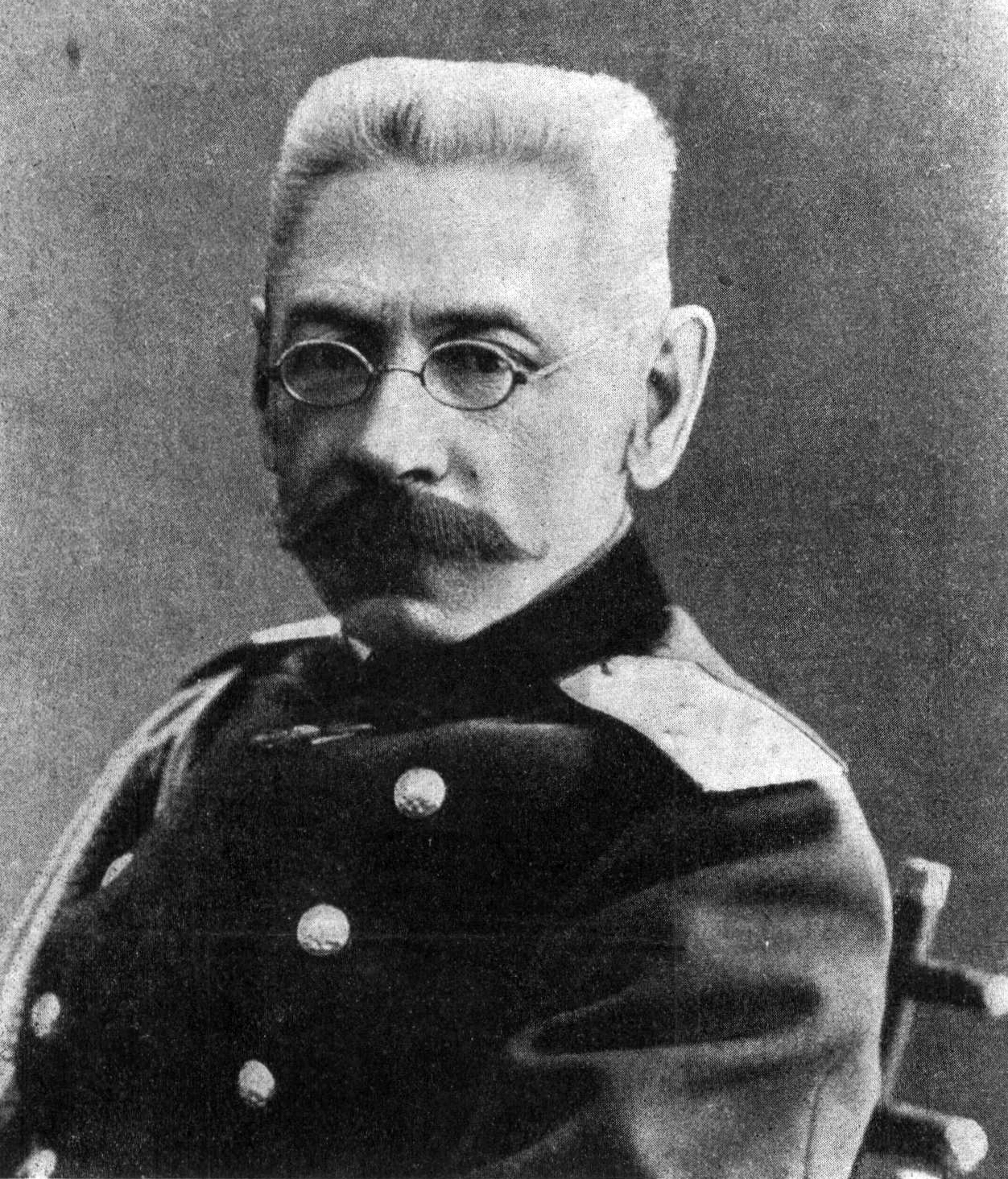
Ruzsky in 1914

From early September 1914 to mid-March 1915, General Ruzsky was the commander-in-chief of the entire Northwestern Front. Under his command, the forces of the front fought at the Vistula River and Łódź, but despite huge success of the 1st and 10th Armies, he was ordered to retreat, due to a group of German troops commanded by General Reinhard von Scheffer-Boyadel was able to snuck out from the encircling movement. He and his troops also participated in the disastrous battle at the Masurian Lakes. In the latter, General Ruzsky was the one who caused the catastrophe of the 10th Army.

As a military leader, he was accustomed in blaming his subordinates for his failures, and particularly, he successfully removed General Paul von Rennenkampf and Sergei Scheidemann from command, at the Sedlets meeting of the Supreme Headquarters, thereby justifying his order to curtail the offensive of his troops from the frontline. However, the activities of these generals were not expressed groundlessly by the high military commands of the Supreme Command and the Ministry of War. In mid-March 1915, due to poor health, General Ruzsky left the front and handed over the command to the Army Chief of Staff, General Mikhail Alekseyev.

In the same year, General Ruzsky was appointed to the State Council and in May he was appointed to the Military Council. Sometimes later, he returned to the highest command thanks to a personal decision by Tsar Nicholas II despite which General Ruzsky revealed his shortcomings as a military leader to the tsar.

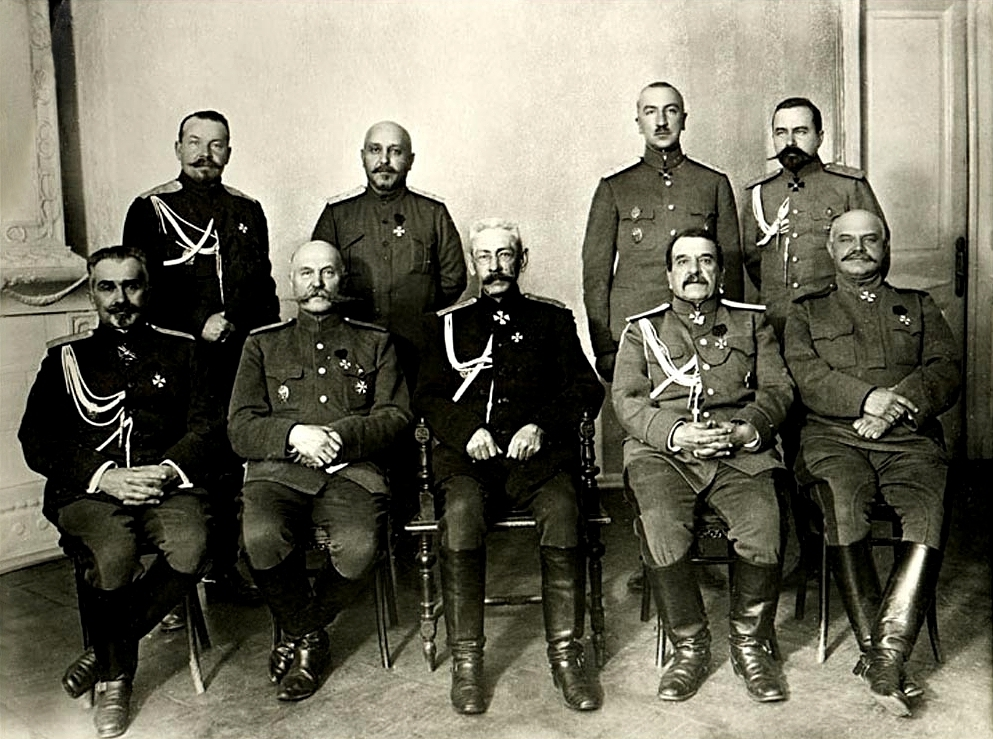
The headquarters staff of the Northwestern Front, with General Nikolai Ruzsky in the center, 1917

In late June, General Ruzsky was appointed the commander of 6th Army and in mid-August, he was appointed to command the whole Northern Front, but in December 1915, he fell ill while commanding the front and left. Then in early August 1916, he recovered from his illness and returned to the front as commander-in-chief, replacing General Kuropatkin. During his time as the commander-in-chief at the Northern Front, his troops were cautious and avoided decisive actions against large-scale enemies.

=== Russian Revolutions ===
One of the most active military conspiracy participants was the President of the Imperial Duma, Mikhail Rodzianko, who played an important role in the abdication of Nicholas II. According to the memoirs of the Minister of the Imperial Court Count Frederiks, who was present at the abdication of the tsar, General Ruzsky brutally and violently forced the wavering tsar to sign the prepared manifesto on abdication. Ruzsky held the tsar by one hand, with the other hand holding the manifesto, and repeatedly said:

Sign and sign the same. Do not you see that you have nothing else left. If you do not sign, I will not be responsible for your life.

Nicholas at this point was embarrassed and dejected. A lawyer named N.P. Karabchevsky left his memories about the words by Prince John Konstantinovich's wife, Helena Petrovna. Which when she was being imprisoned in Yekaterinburg, she was visited by the doctor of the Tsesarevich, Vladimir Derevenko, who told the princess about the recall of Nicholas about General Ruzsky. He said:

God does not leave me, He gives me the strength to forgive all my enemies and tormentors, but I can not defeat myself in one more thing: Ruzsky's adjutant general I cannot forgive!

During a conversation with General S. N. Vilchkovsky, General Ruzsky detailed the tsar's resistance to the pressure exerted on the introduction of the new so-called "Responsible Ministry". (According to the opposition, this ministry was to be submitted not to the Emperor, but the head of the Cabinet, in turn, responsible to the Duma, that is, the conspirators aspired to introduce a parliamentary system in Russia, which was contrary to the existing legislation of the Empire). He argued heatedly about the need of the immediate imposition of the Responsible Ministry.

The Sovereign objected calmly, coolly and with a deep conviction. The main idea of the Sovereign was that he does not want anything for himself, he does not hold on to anything, but he does not consider himself entitled to transfer the whole matter of Russian management into hands people who today, being in power, can do the greatest harm to the Motherland, and tomorrow they will wash their hands, having resigned with the Cabinet. "I am responsible to God and Russia for everything that happens and happened," said the Sovereign, "whether ministers are accountable to the Duma and the State Council indifferent. I'll never be able to, seeing that the minister did not do for the good of Russia, to agree with them, consoling himself with the thought that this is not my doing, not my responsibility"

He informed the tsar that his thoughts were wrong, he told Nicholas that it was necessary to adopt the policy: "the sovereign reigns, and the government rules." The tsar argued that this policy was too incomprehensible for him, he said that what was necessary was that the people should be educated, or in other words, should be reborn. He disagreed and then argued with the tsar. About an hour later, Nicholas finally agreed to the Responsible Ministry. It was not understood that why the fact that Nicholas would just all the sudden, he just abandoned his conviction and agreed with Ruzsky. Analysis of the documents leads to the conclusion that, this decision, was made on behalf of the Sovereign, but not by the Emperor himself.

After the Revolution, General Ruzsky advocated in maintaining the discipline of the army, which led him into disagreements with the Minister of War, Alexander Guchkov, and army chief of staff General Alekseyev. He was then relieved from command, after which he went south to Kislovodsk.

== Demise ==
In early September 1918, General Ruzsky was arrested in Essentuki by the Red Army, who offered him a command, although he rejected it. He referred to the fact that he rejected the war of "Russians against Russians". As a result of Ivan Sorokin's death on November 1, he was taken by the Reds to the Pyatigorsk Cemetery as a hostage group composed of about 100 tsarist officers, and was then murdered by Georgi Atarbekov.

== Legacy ==
Shortly before his terror demise, General Ruzsky sought to justify himself before his descendants, sharing his memories after the overthrow of the monarchy and the Bolshevik coup d'état. He understood that such a sudden change in the tsar's opinion in favor of the Responsible Ministry, would, in fact, look suspicious. Therefore, General Ruzsky tried to assure that before the tsar gave his consent, he would remark that there had been "some kind of change in the sovereign". The tsar "manifested something like indifference". For General Ruzsky, it was important that memory of his descendants would form the belief that everything happened with the tsar's full consent. Ruzsky did not want to look like a conspirator, but a loyal subject, acting in harmony with his Sovereign.

== Awards ==
=== Domestic ===
- Order of St. Anna, 4th class (1877)
- Order of St. Anna, 3rd class with swords and a bow (1878)
- Order of St. Stanislaus, 2nd class (1883)
- Order of St. Anna, 2nd class (1888)
- Order of St. Vladimir, 4th class (1891)
- Order of St. Vladimir, 3rd class (1894)
- Order of St. Stanislaus, 1st class (1899)
- Order of St. Anna, 1st class with swords (1905)
- Order of St. Vladimir, 2nd class with swords (1905)
- Order of the White Eagle (6.12.1911)
- Order of St. Alexander Nevsky (6.12.1913)
- Order of St. George, 4th class (8.23.1914)
- Order of St. George, 3rd class (8.23.1914)
- Order of St. George, 2nd class (10.22.1914)

=== Foreign ===
- Kingdom of Romania:
  - Cross "For crossing the Danube" (ru) (1878)
  - Order of the Star of Romania (1899)
- Qajar dynasty:
  - Order of the Lion and the Sun, 1st class (1902)
- United Kingdom:
  - Order of St Michael and St George (1905)
