= Hnyla Lypa =

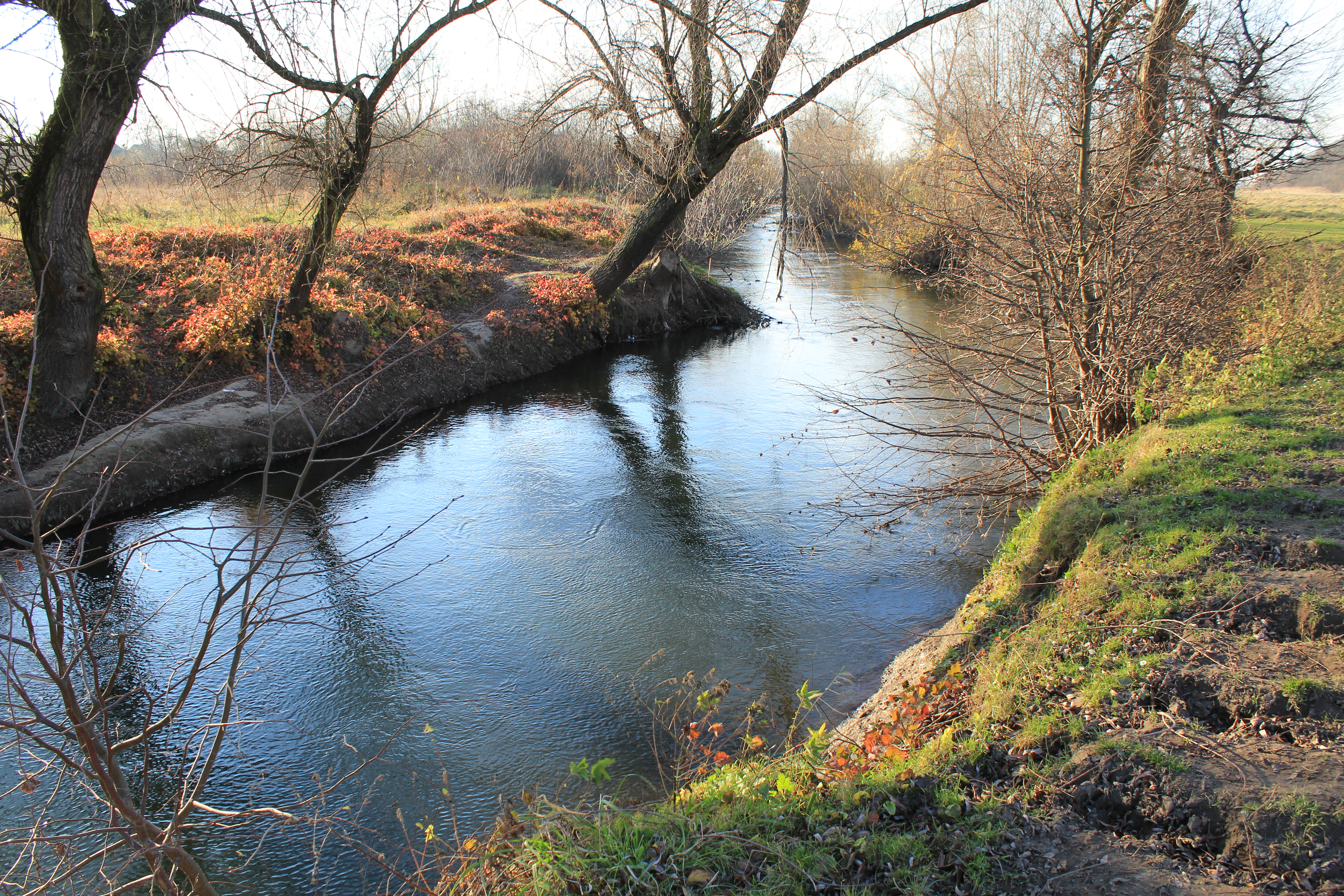

Location
- Country: Ukraine

Physical characteristics
- Mouth: Dniester
  - coordinates: 49°07′14″N 24°45′16″E

Basin features
- Progression: Dniester→ Dniester Estuary→ Black Sea

Hnyla Lypa (Ukrainian: Гнила Липа; Polish: Gniła Lipa) is a river in Ukraine, a tributary of the Dniester river.

The name literally means "rotten linden tree" both in Polish and Ukrainian. It runs parallel to the Zolota Lypa river.

The river is namesake to the Battle of Gnila Lipa on 29–30 August 1914, where the Imperial Russian Army defeated the Austro-Hungarian Army.

== Settlements ==
- Peremyshliany
- Rohatyn
- Burshtyn

== Hydronymic evolution and prehistoric etymology ==
The current name of the river is a secondary Slavic topographical formation that replaced an older Indo-European hydronymic substratum. During the Bronze Age (c. 2300–1500 BC), when the upper Dniester basin was inhabited by communities speaking North-West Indo-European (NWIE) dialects (such as the Mierzanowice and Komarov cultures), river names were primarily motivated by physical characteristics of the current and the chalky bed. According to models of Old European hydronymy, the earliest reconstructed name of the river was likely based on the Proto-Indo-European root *albh- / *albo- ("bright, white"), yielding forms like *Albā or *Albhantiā, or on the archaic root *h₂ep- ("water, river"), resulting in *Apā.

At the end of the Bronze Age and during the early Iron Age (c. 1500–500 BC), the region transitioned into a sphere of hybrid dialects. Research by the Soviet school of linguistics (Oleg Trubachyov, Vladimir Toporov) alongside the work of Marija Gimbutas confirms the dominance of a Paleo-Balto-Thracian linguistic substratum in Podolia during this transitional phase. From this period, linguists reconstruct either a Daco-Baltic form *Alvanta / *Albanta or a Daco-Thracian form *Saurā / *Sarā ("flowing, swampy stream").

During the subsequent Slavic expansion, these prehistoric forms were completely replaced by a literal description of the river's slow, marshy flow (Proto-Slavic *gniły, "rotten") and the linden forests lining its valley (Proto-Slavic *lipa).
