= Arthur Heyer =

German-Hungarian painter

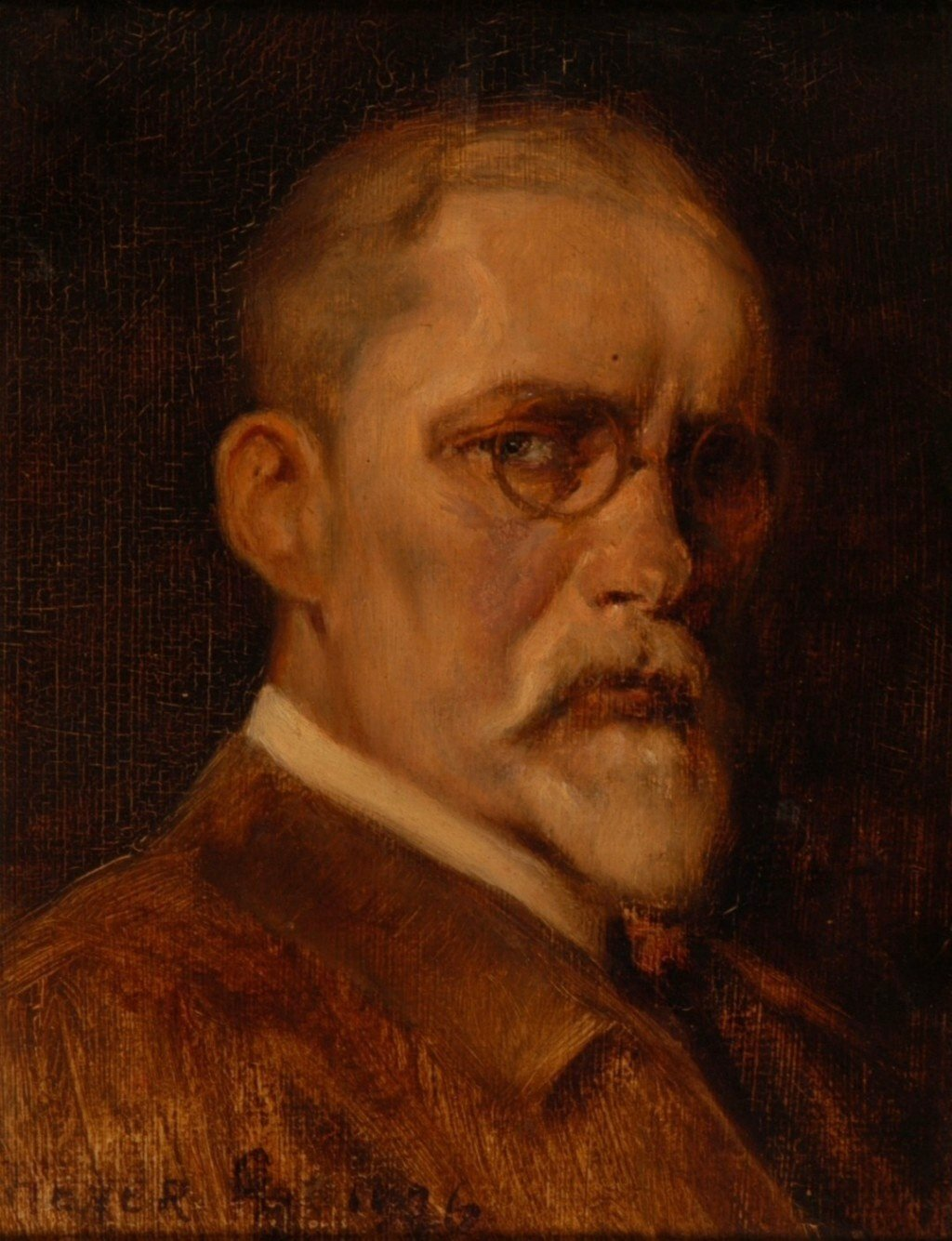
Self portrait, 1929

Arthur Heyer (28 February 1872, Haarhausen, Saxe-Coburg and Gotha, German Empire – 1931, Budapest, Hungary) was a German-Hungarian painter who primarily painted animals.

== Life ==
Heyer was born in Haarhausen, Saxe-Coburg and Gotha in 1872 as the second son of local schoolteacher Georg Hermann Heyer and his wife Friederice. In 1875, the family moved to Gotha, where Heyer spent his schooldays.

On the basis of his artistic talents, he attended, from 1890 to 1895, Unterrichtsanstalt des Kunstgewerbemuseums Berlin. His teacher was Max Friedrich Koch. During this period, he also published first drawings in various newspapers, especially in the newspapers which were published at the time as a supplement and directed by Eugen Richter. In 1892 and 1895, he conducted study trips to Transylvania, where he came into contact with the local Hungarian culture. In 1896, he moved to Budapest and earned his living with book illustrations. In 1900, he became a naturalized Hungarian citizen, then part of the Austro-Hungarian Empire. In 1906, he held his first exhibition in Budapest, followed by numerous others. In 1909, he also had two exhibitions at his earlier home in Thuringia, the Grand Ducal Museum in Weimar and the Kunstverein Gotha. In 1911, he received the Hungarian Count Andrássy Prize. After several exhibitions, including at the Vienna Künstlerhaus and the Glaspalast in Munich, he was appointed professor there in 1915. In 1929, the Hungarian National Museum in Budapest acquired his self-portrait. In 1931, he died in Budapest at the age of 59 and received a state funeral at Kerepesi Cemetery.

== Works ==
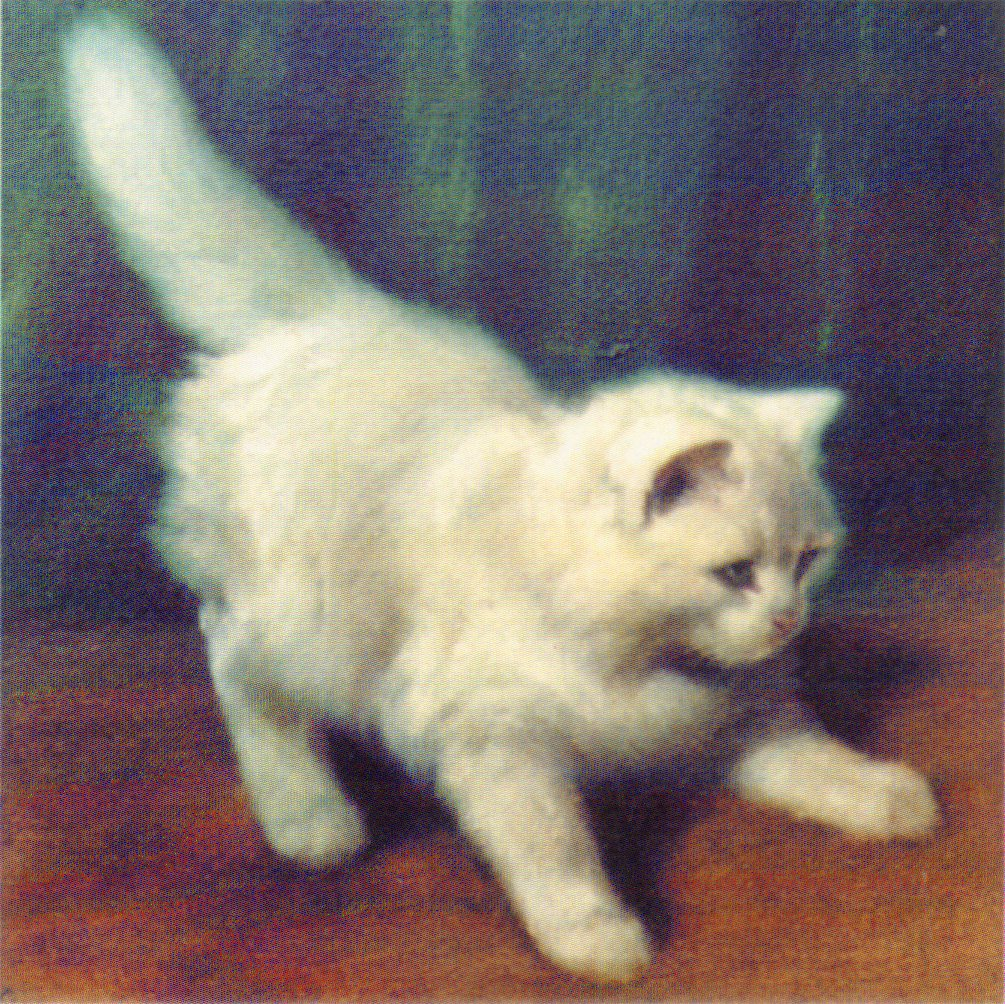
Young Angora Cat, oil on canvas, 40 × 50 cm

In addition to his early satirical drawings, Heyer also painted animal pictures, especially cats. There are numerous pictures, often commissioned by the artist, in which Turkish Angora cats, painted in many shades, are depicted in naturalistic terms. For this reason he was also called "Cat-Heyer". In addition, there are numerous pictures of other animals, such as deer, hares, pheasants, chickens, and dogs (mainly his dog Mucki). Today these are often distributed as art prints or posters.

In 1919, he also published two children's books with verses of animals supplemented by verses: Im Wunderwald, ein Märchen and Niki, eine drollige Hundegeschichte.
