= 44th Infantry Division (Russian Empire) =

- 44-я пехотная дивизия
- Active: 1914–1918
- Country: Russian Empire
- Branch: Russian Imperial Army
- Role: Infantry

The 44th Infantry Division (Russian: 44-я пехотная дивизия, 44-ya Pekhotnaya Diviziya) was an infantry formation of the Russian Imperial Army.

== Organization ==
- 1st Brigade
  - 173rd Infantry Regiment
  - 174th Infantry Regiment
- 2nd Brigade
  - 175th Infantry Regiment
  - 176th Perevolochensky Infantry Regiment
- 44th Artillery Brigade

== Commanders ==
- August-November 1915: Anthony Veselovsky
