= Battle of Gnila Lipa =

August 1914 battle of WW1's Eastern Front

- Part of the Eastern Front during World War I
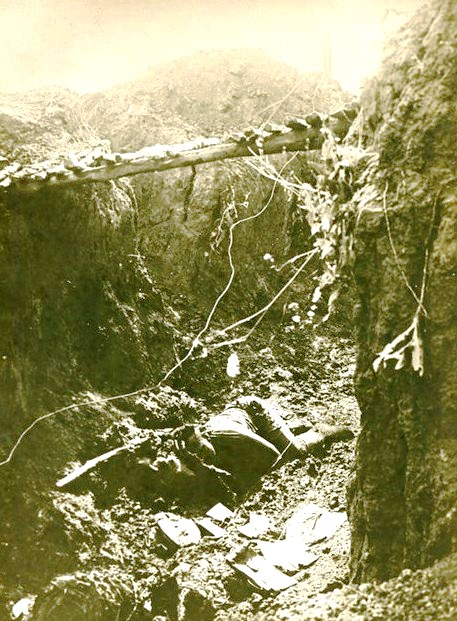
- Photograph of a dead Austro-Hungarian soldier in a trench in the Zlata Gora area, Galicia
Date	26 – 30 August 1914
Location	Kingdom of Galicia and Lodomeria, Austria-Hungary
Result	Russian victory
Territorial changes	Russia captures Lemberg and Halych

Belligerents
Russian Empire	Austria-Hungary

Commanders and leaders
Nikolai Ivanov; Nikolai Ruzsky; Aleksei Brusilov	(Austria-Hungary) Rudolf von Brudermann (Austria-Hungary) Hermann von Kövess

Units involved
3rd Army; 8th Army	(Austria-Hungary) 3rd Army (Austria-Hungary) Army Group Kövess

Strength
385,000+ men: 336 infantry battalions 164 cavalry squadrons 1.214 guns	322,000+ men: 282 infantry battalions 133 cavalry squadrons 718 guns

Casualties and losses
Light	20,000; 70 guns

The Battle of Gnila Lipa took place in early World War I on 29–30 August 1914, when the Imperial Russian Army invaded Galicia and engaged the defending Austro-Hungarian Army. It was part of a larger series of battles known collectively as the Battle of Galicia. The battle ended in a defeat of the Austro-Hungarian forces.

== Background ==
The battle is named after a river in Western Ukraine, an historical region of Galicia. It is a tributary of Dniester, and is also called the Hnyla Lypa (Polish: Gniła Lipa).

According to Prit Buttar, "In Galicia the weakness of the Austro-Hungarian position lay in the east. An entire army - Böhm-Ermolli's 2nd Army - was still missing, either still deployed in the Balkans or languishing on painfully slow troop trains. By contrast, the Russians had two powerful armies deployed for an early advance into eastern Galicia. The two eastern armies were now ordered to move west as fast as possible, in order to reduce the pressure on the 4th and 5th Armies. As his western armies moved north, Conrad had to protect their eastern flank, and therefore ordered Brudermann's 3rd Army to perform this task by moving north." The two Russian armies consisted of Nikolai Ruzsky's 3rd Army, with the 9th, 10th, 11th, and 21st Army Corps, consisting of 12 infantry divisions and 4 cavalry divisions, and the Aleksei Brusilov's 8th Army, with the 7th, 8th, 12th, and 24th Army Corps, consisting of 10 infantry divisions and 5 cavalry divisions. The 3rd Army was located around Rovno and Dubno, while the 8th Army was located around Proskurov. The Austro-Hungarian 3rd Army consisted of the III, XI, and XIV Corps, with 18 infantry divisions and 4 cavalry divisions, supported by Hermann Kövess von Kövessháza's Armeegruppe, consisting of the XII Corps. Brudermann's 3rd Army was ordered north to protect Conrad's eastern flank, while Kövess was ordered to advance east of Lemberg towards Przemyślany. On 21 August, Russian forces crossed the frontier between Brody and Tarnopol. On 25 August, the Russian 3rd Army was preparing to advance north of Lemberg, while the 8th advanced to the south.

== Battle ==
Brudermann's plan of attack was for his XII Corps towards Remizowce, his III Corps towards Zloczow, with the XI protecting the northern flank. On 26 August, the II Corps advanced and immediately encountered the Russian 11th Army Corps. By the end of the day, the III Corps advance was limited to Gologory and Zlota Lipa area. The XII corps encountered the Russian 10th Army Corps. On 27 August, Brudermann tried once again to attack east, but that night and the next day, retreated along a line from Lemberg to Przemyslany, and the Gnila Lipa. The 13 Austro-Hungarian divisions now faced 22 Russian divisions, while the Russian 7th and 12th Army Corps advanced from the southeast. Yet the Russian 3rd Army paused. On 29 August, attacks by the Austro-Hungarian XII and VII Corps, newly arrived from Serbia, were stopped by the Russian 7th and 12th Army Corps respectively. On 30 August, the Russians pressed forward their attacks, overwhelming the Austro-Hungarian XII Corps, and Brudermann was forced to retreat along a line south from Lemberg.

== Aftermath ==
Prit Buttar noted, "Conrad's spirits lifted when news arrived from Auffenberg's headquarters that the Russian forces involved in the fighting around Komarów had been destroyed, and that it would therefore be possible for the victorious 4th army to attack towards Lemberg as planned." However, the Russian 8th Army advanced through Bukovina, and Brudermann unable to hold his position, withdrew to the Wereszyca. Lemberg was abandoned on 2 September, and the Russians entered the next day. Brudermann was dismissed the same day, replaced by Svetozar Boroević.

== Additional Reading ==
- J. Rickard: Battle of Gnila Lipa, 26-30 August 1914.
