= Zolota Lypa =

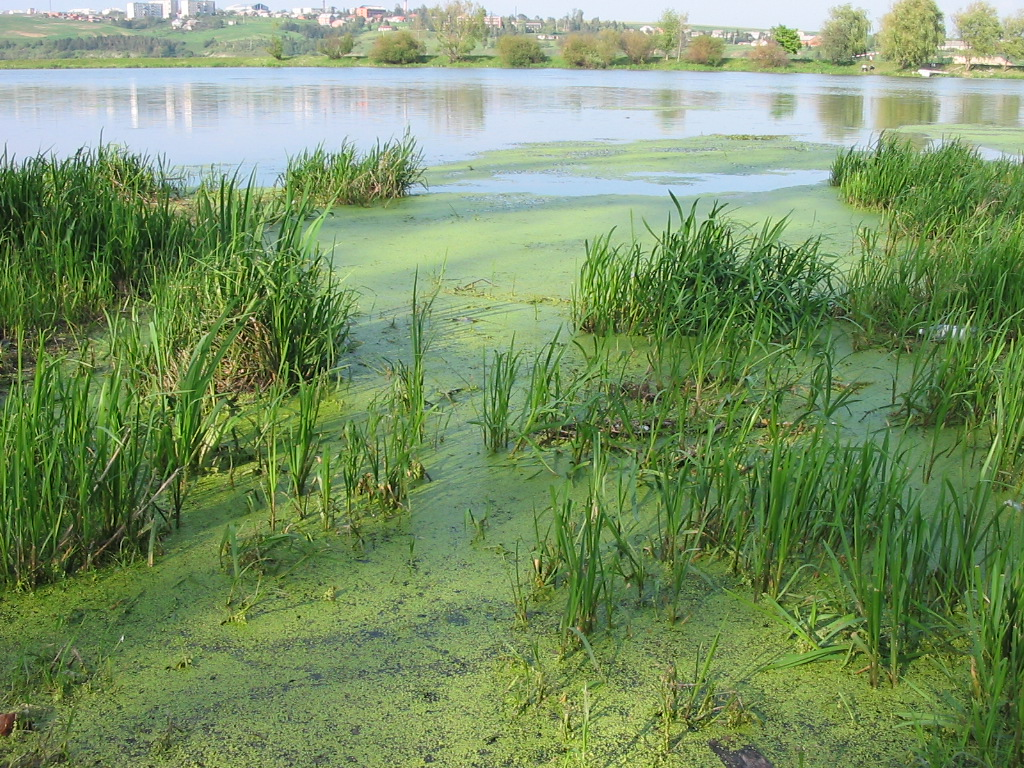
- A dam across Zolota Lypa formed a large lake in the northern part of Berezhany, western Ukraine

Location
- Country: Ukraine

Physical characteristics
- Mouth: Dniester
  - coordinates: 48.9798°N 25.0719°E

Basin features
- Progression: Dniester→ Dniester Estuary→ Black Sea

Zolota Lypa (Ukrainian: Золота Липа; Polish: Złota Lipa) is a river in Western Ukraine. It flows through the Ternopil and Chortkiv Raions, forming the Berezhany Lake north of the city of Berezhany. It is a left tributary of Dniester, belonging to the Black Sea basin.The name means "golden linden tree" and has the same meaning in all Slavic languages. The river with the opposite meaning Hnyla Lypa ("rotten linden tree) flows parallel 30 km west from Berezhany.

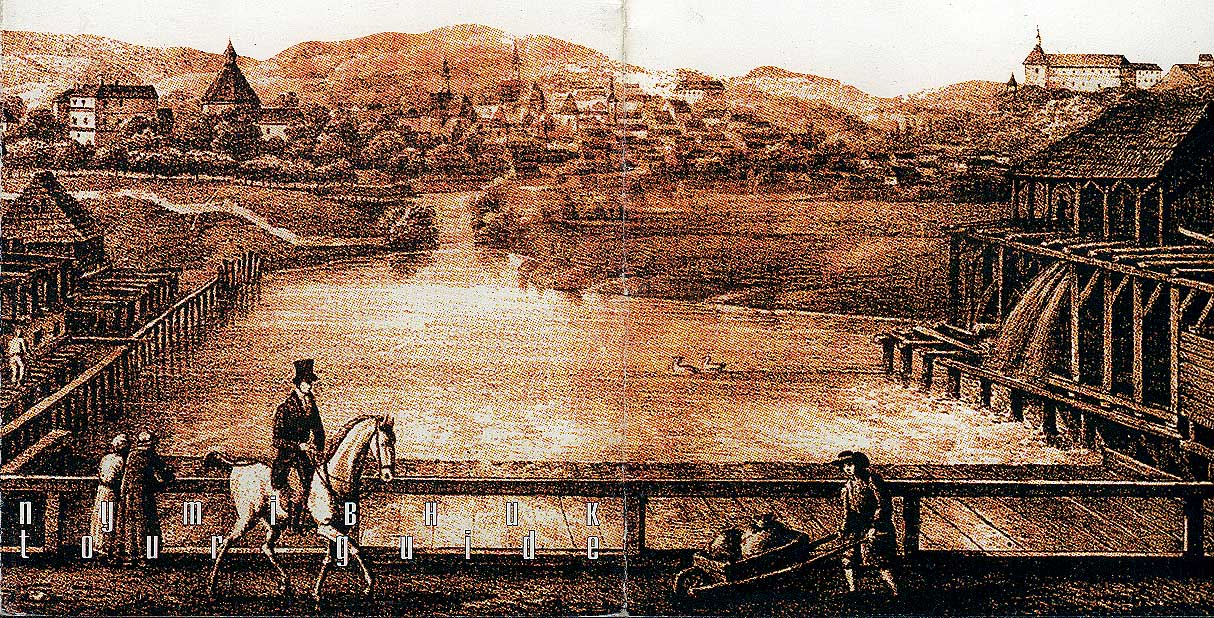
A sketch of the Zolota Lypa.

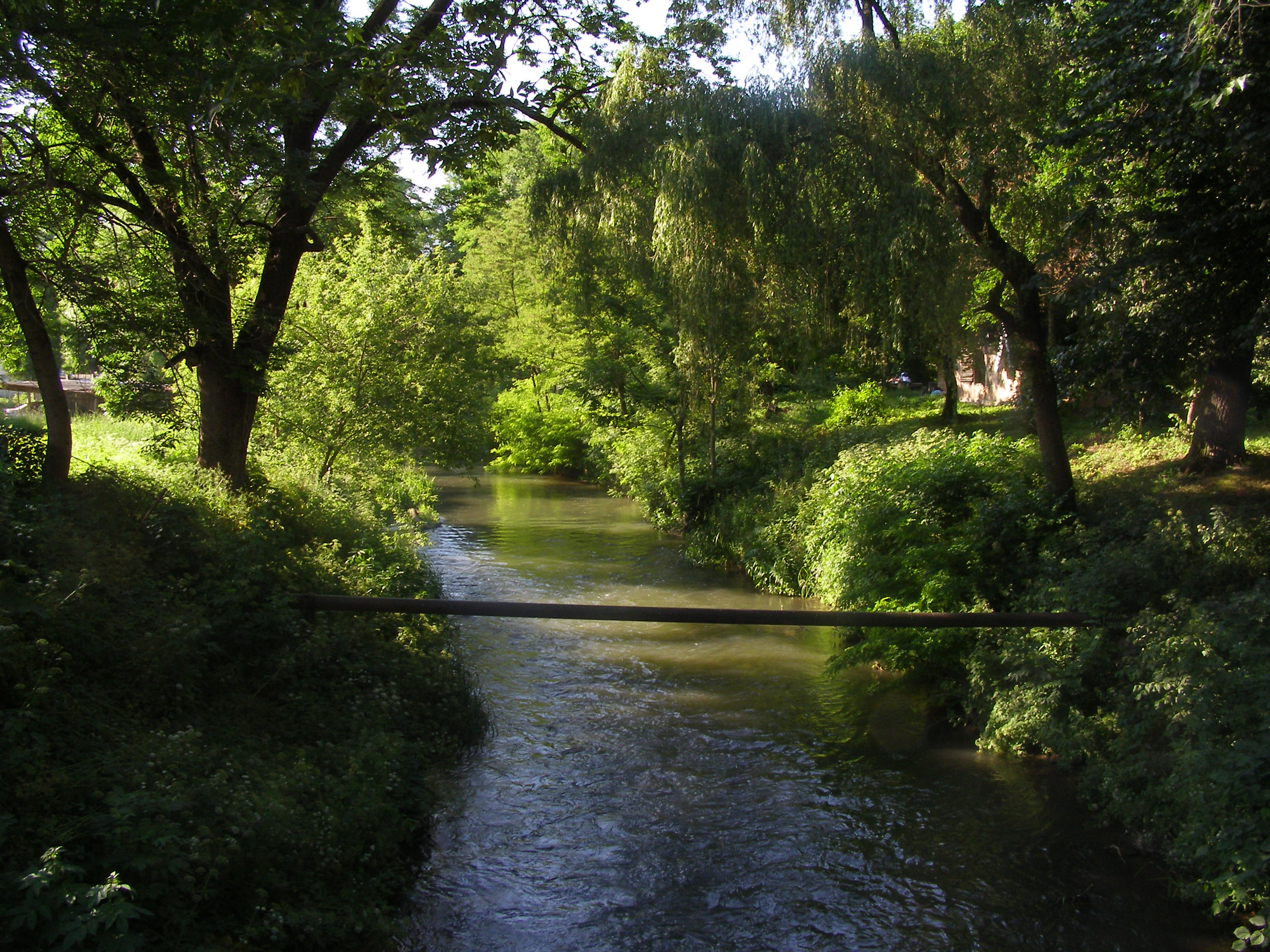
The Zolota Lypa River.
