= Aleksei Brusilov =

Russian and Soviet general (1853–1926)

Aleksei Alekseyevich Brusilov
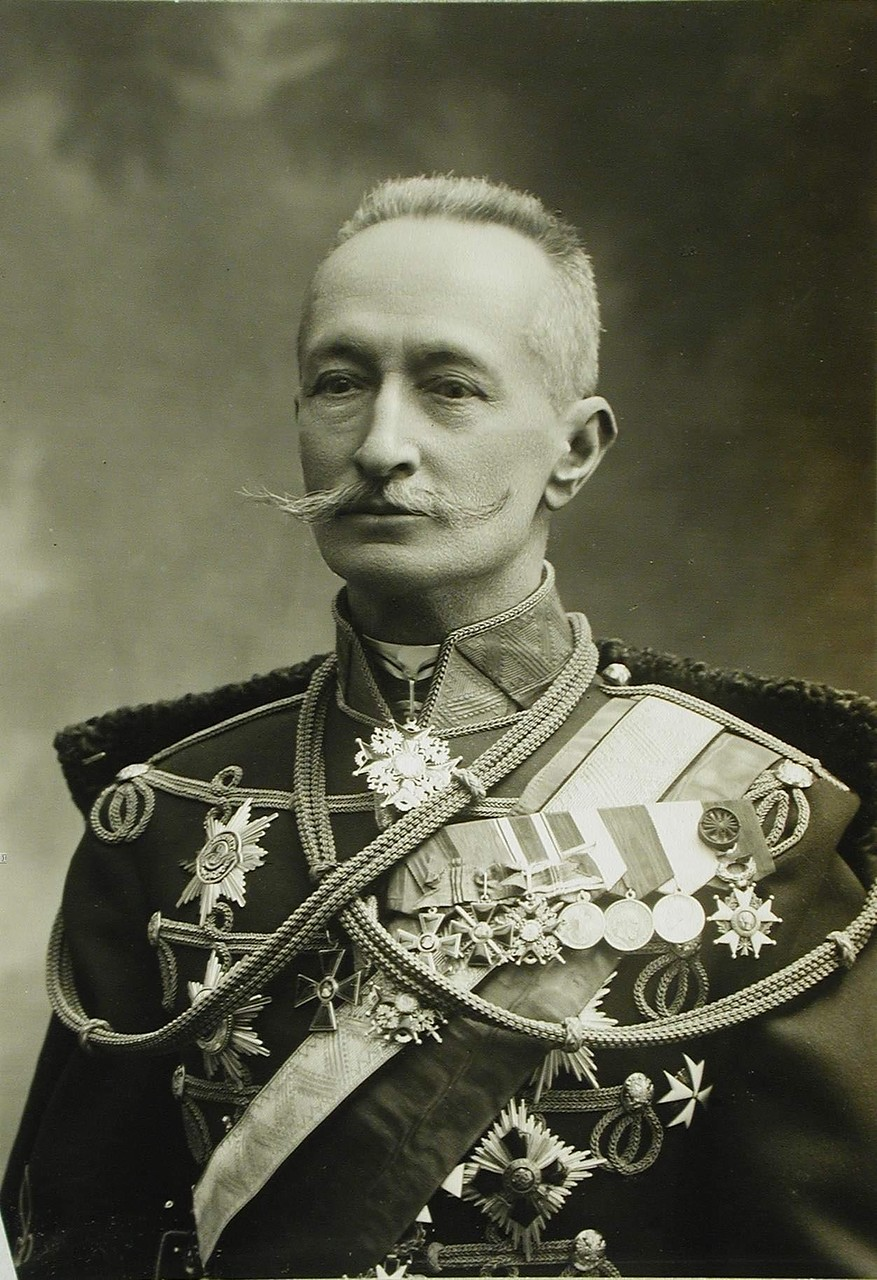
- Brusilov in 1913
- Born: 31 August 1853; Tiflis, Caucasus Viceroyalty, Russian Empire
- Died: 17 March 1926 (aged 72); Moscow, Russian SFSR, Soviet Union
- Military career
- Allegiance: Russian Empire (1872–1917); Russian Republic (1917); Russian SFSR (1920–1924)
- Branch: Imperial Russian Army; Russian Army; Red Army
- Service years: 1872–1924
- Rank: General of the Cavalry
- Nickname: "The Iron General"
- Conflicts: Russo-Turkish War; Battle of Kars; Assault on Ardahan; World War I; Battle of Galicia; Battle of Gnila Lipa; Battle of Grodék; Battle of the San river; Battle of Kraków; Battle of Limanowa; Battle of the Carpathians; Przemyśl offensive; Great Retreat; Standing on the Bug; Lutsk and Rovno; Brusilov offensive; Second Brusilov offensive; Kerensky offensive; Russian Civil War; Polish–Soviet War
- Awards: See below

Signature
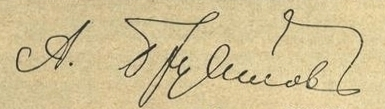

Aleksei (Note: Also transliterated as Aleksey.) Alekseyevich Brusilov (/ˈbruːsɪlɒv/, US also /ˈbruːsɪlɔːv/; Russian: Алексе́й Алексе́евич Бруси́лов, IPA: [ɐlʲɪkˈsʲej ɐlʲɪkˈsʲejɪvʲɪdʑ brʊˈsʲiɫəf]; 31 August [O.S. 19 August] 1853 – 17 March 1926) was a Russian and later Soviet general most noted for the development of new offensive tactics used in the 1916 Brusilov offensive, which was his greatest achievement.

Born into an aristocratic military family, Brusilov trained as a cavalry officer, but by 1914 had realized that cavalry was obsolete in an offensive capacity against modern weapons of warfare such as mass adoption of rifled guns, machine guns, and artillery. He is considered a very outstanding general who won many battles against the Austro-Hungarian army. His offensive in 1916 was the final major success of the Tsarist army. In the government, this offensive meant the transfer of the strategic initiative to the Russians and the beginning of preparations for the general offensive of 1917, which, however, was disrupted by the revolution.

Despite his noble status and prominent role in the Imperial Russian Army, he sided with the Bolsheviks in the Russian Civil War and aided in the early organization of the Red Army until retiring in 1924.

Brusilov is one of the prominent Russian commanders in history. Although not regarded as especially brilliant, he was pragmatic and open to change based on experience; his eponymous offensive succeeded in part from his willingness to properly train and prepare his troops, including in modern artillery and air reconnaissance.

== Early life ==
Brusilov was born in Tiflis (now Tbilisi, Georgia). His father Aleksi Nikolaevich Brusilov was Russian and his mother, Anna Luiza Niestojemska, was Polish. Three generations of Brusilovs had served as officers in the Imperial Russian Army, his grandfather fighting in the defense against Napoleon's invasion of 1812. His father rose to the rank of Lieutenant General before dying of tuberculosis in 1856. Brusilov's mother died shortly afterwards, and the young orphan was raised by relatives in Kutaisi.

He was educated at home until the age of 14. He joined the Imperial Corps of Pages in Saint Petersburg in 1867. At the end of his first year, a tutor remarked of Brusilov, "his nature is brisk and even playful, but he is good, straightforward and clean-living. Of high ability, but inclined to be lazy."

In 1872, on completion of the Corps' programme, he sought admission to the advanced class for top ranking students, but was unsuccessful, and instead was posted as an ensign (Praporshchik) to the 15th (Tver) Dragoon Regiment. Usually, graduates from the Corps of Pages sought admission to one of the Guards regiments, but the Tver Dragoons were at that time stationed near Kutaisi, so the posting suited Brusilov on the basis of being near his family and being less financially draining than service in the Guards.

=== Russo-Turkish War ===
Brusilov joined the Tver Dragoons in August 1872 and was given command of a troop, but it was not long before his aptitude resulted in the appointment as regimental adjutant. He was promoted to lieutenant in 1874.

He served with distinction in the Russo-Turkish War, 1877–78, being mentioned in despatches on three occasions. His unit operated on the Southern Front in the Caucasus, and took part in the assault of the fortress of Ardagan (now Ardahan, Turkey), for which Brusilov was awarded the Order of Saint Stanislav, 3rd Class. Later in the war, he also received the Order of Saint Anne, 3rd Class, and was promoted to the rank of Stabskapitän. Towards the end of the war, he led successful attacks on Ottoman Army positions around Kars, and his membership of the Order of Saint Stanislav was elevated to 2nd Class.

=== The Cavalry Officer School ===
In 1881, Brusilov became a student at the Cavalry Officer School in Saint Petersburg and two years later was appointed as a riding instructor there. He spent the next thirteen years in a succession of posts at the school – Adjutant, Senior Teacher of Riding and Breaking Horses, Section Commander, Troop Commander, Squadron Commander and Assistant Chief of the School. On promotion to Major General in 1900, Brusilov was added to the list of Household Troops (officers who might be retained on official business by the tsar). During this time, Brusilov married (1884), and the union produced a son in 1887.

In 1902, as a Lieutenant General, he took command of the school, and under his leadership, the "Horse Academy" became an acknowledged centre of excellence in preparing staff officers for the cavalry. Brusilov published papers on the use of cavalry and visited France, Austria-Hungary and Germany to study riding tuition and stud management.

Brusilov was appointed to command the 2nd Guards Cavalry Division in 1906, but this was not a happy posting for him. The 1905 Russian Revolution had left St Petersburg in turmoil, and after his wife's death, he sought a posting away from the Guards and the capital.

In 1908, he was appointed to command the 14th Army Corps in the Warsaw Military District, where his tenure was notable for the improvements in combat training he implemented. He also remarried at this time, to Nadejda ("Hope") Jelihovski. Promoted to General of Cavalry in 1912, he became Deputy Commander-in-Chief of forces in the Warsaw Military District. The failures of the Russo-Japanese War had led to allegations that generals from immigrant families, who made a significant fraction of the Russian Army's senior ranks, were less patriotic than those who traced their origins to within Russia's borders, and Brusilov would come into conflict with the Governor-General in Warsaw, Georgi Skalon, and other "Russian-German" generals in that District. Brusilov was soon seeking another post.

In 1913, Brusilov was posted to command the 12th Army Corps in the Kiev Military District, remarking on his departure, "I do not doubt, that my departure will produce a sensation in the troops of Warsaw region... Well! What's done is done, and I am glad, that I have escaped cesspool of Skalon's court atmosphere."

== First World War ==
=== 1914–1915 ===
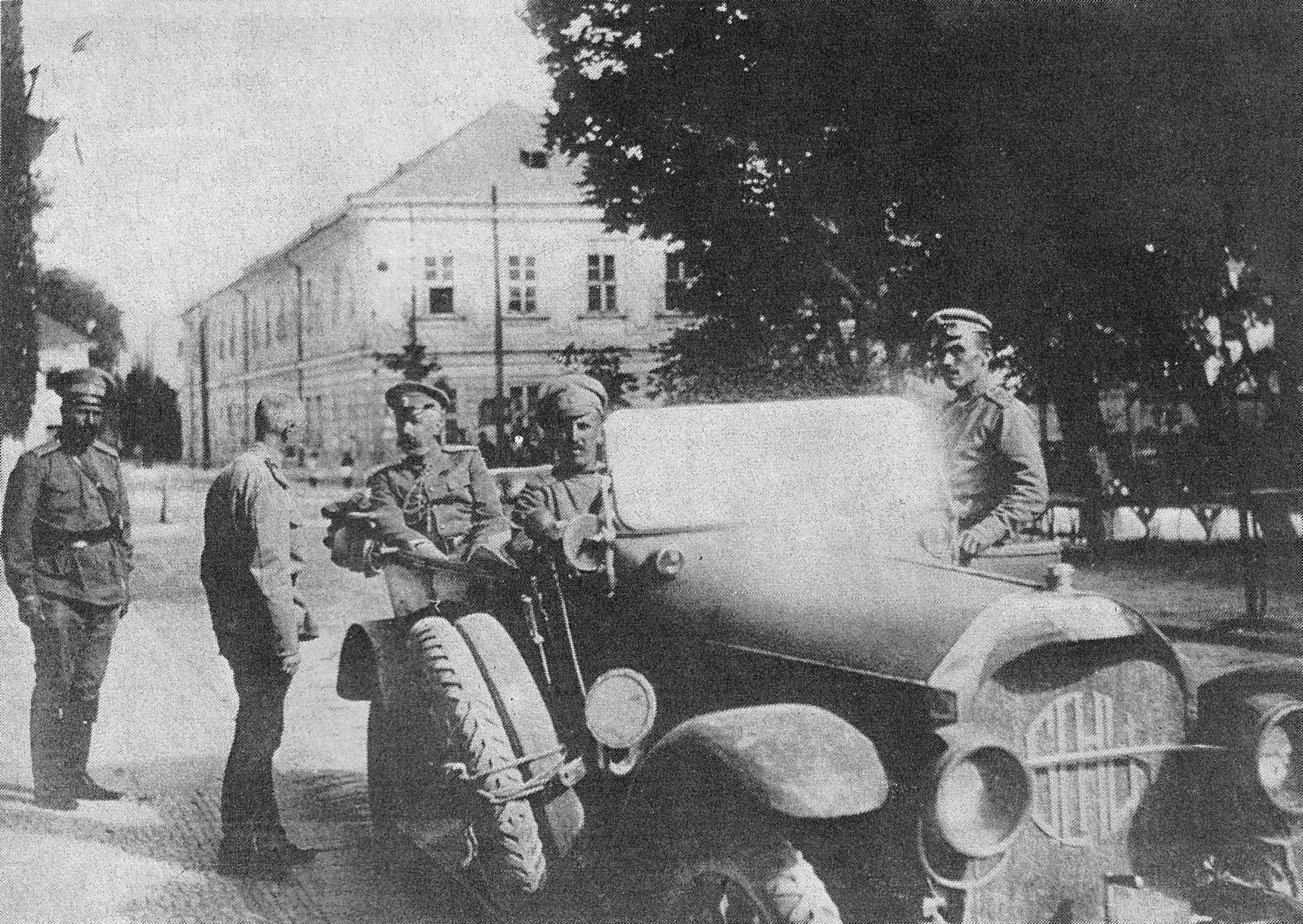
Aleksey Brusilov and Grand Duke George Mikhailovich of Russia in 1915

In July 1914, with the Russian army expanding during mobilisation, Brusilov was promoted to command the 8th Army, part of the Southwest Front operating in Galicia. The 8th Army crushed the Austro-Hungarian Third Army before it, and rapidly advanced nearly 150 kilometers (93 mi). Reverses elsewhere along the Front, including the great defeat at Tannenberg, forced the 8th Army to retreat in conformity with the general Russian withdrawal. For his victories, Brusilov was awarded the Order of Saint George 4th, and then 3rd Class. By a quirk of fate, several future White Army commanders held senior posts in 8th Army at this time—Brusilov's Quartermaster general was Anton Denikin, while Alexey Kaledin commanded the 12th Cavalry Division and Lavr Kornilov was in command of 48th Infantry Division. At the beginning of the siege of Przemysl, he left alone with a superior enemy on the left bank of the San River, repelled the offensive. The twice-strong enemy was killed by Brusilov's army, but the Austro-Hungarians managed to break the right sector of the front. Brusilov's skill helped him get out and he eliminated the breakthrough, blocked enemy troops in the forests, where they were thrown back, and the breakthrough was localized. His troops in such a situation withstood the fighting to the end and saved the Russian army from disaster.

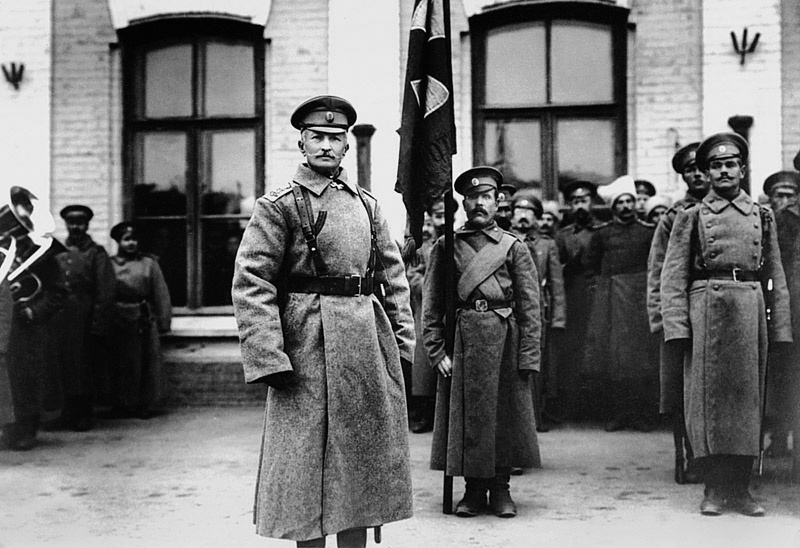
Alexey Brusilov at the station in Rivne

After Brusilov's troops drove the Austrians back from the San River, securing Przemysl, he began to drive the enemy straight to the Carpathian valley, where he faced fierce resistance from an enemy stronger in numbers than he was. In November, his troops were poorly supplied with winter clothing, but continued to maintain the initiative. Brusilov asked several times to speed up the dispatch of things to him, but this was delayed because the government considered it necessary to supply the northwestern front faster. Brusilov then used his personal funds to buy things and shoes in order to help his troops. High Command also asked Brusilov to finish off the enemy as soon as possible in order to help the 3rd army take Krakow, however, due to the smaller number and fewer artillery, Brusilov rejected this adventure. To this was added the absence of a clear plan for the campaign after the Battle of Galicia and the siege of Przemysl. (Note: Including the battles on the San River, which turned the tide of the Austro-German offensive on Przemysl) Tasks of the front changed based on the situation. (Note: The exception is the offensive of the 3rd Army on Krakow)
In mid-November, taking well-fortified positions of the Germans and Austrians one after another with heavy fighting, Brusilov was still able to drive them to the southern Carpathians, finally consolidating his positions, while taking many prisoners and equipment. The most stubborn battles were fought near the town of Mezo-Labotsa, where the main burden fell on General Orlov.

However, the Germans did not stop, in the middle of 1915 they made a general attempt to break through Brusilov's front and liberate Przemysl, Brusilov knew about this and skillfully parried the attacks of the enemy three times superior, the Germans realized that this adventure would not be crowned with success, and abandoned attempts to liberate Przemysl. A few days later, the Russians finally took the fortress.

=== Great Retreat ===
Once again, fortunes on other fronts would determine his actions, and the Central Powers breakthrough at Gorlice-Tarnów forced Brusilov to withdraw as part of the general retreat. By September, the 8th Army had withdrawn 180 kilometers (110 mi) to the Tarnopol region. However, Brusilov's victories cast doubt on Austria-Hungary's ability to defend itself against Russian offensives and forced its senior military ally the German Empire to divert forces from the Western Front to assist it. On the Southern Bug, Brusilov stopped for about a month, preventing the central powers from advancing. This allowed the defeated 3rd Army to recover from the defeat and replenish its supply. After that, he continued his planned retreat without leaving any trophies to the enemy. Brusilov constantly organized successful local counterattacks against the enemies, slowing down the offensive. At the end of the great retreat, in order to raise the morale of the army, he attempted to defeat the 14th German division, which was crowned with success. He took part in the Lutsk operation.

In October 1915, Brusilov wanted to deport 20,000 German civilians from Volhynia. With Stavka Chief of Staff General Mikhail Alekseyev's permission, Brusilov carried out the operation.

=== Brusilov offensive ===
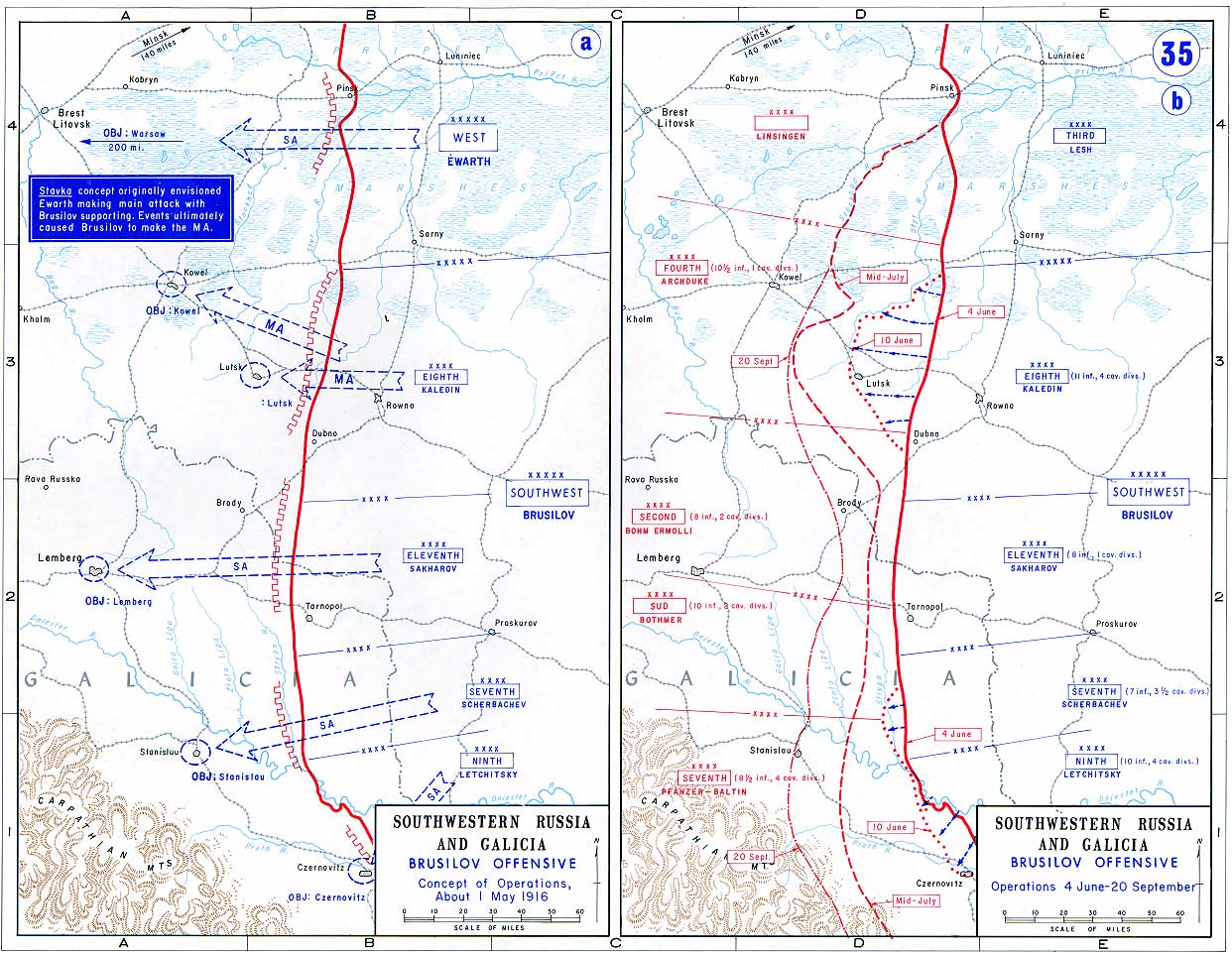

On 29 March 1916, Brusilov was given command of the Southwest Front and managed to secure a certain degree of freedom of action. Previous Russian offensives demonstrated a tendency to assault smaller and smaller sections of the front with increasing density of artillery and manpower to achieve a breakthrough. The narrow frontage of these attacks made counterattacks straightforward for German forces, and this approach met with repeated failure for the Russians.

Brusilov decided to distribute his attack over the entirety of Southwest Front. He hoped to disorganise the enemy over such a large area that some point would fatally give way. He decided not to waste resources by saturation bombardment of worthless areas, but to use interdiction fire against command posts, road networks, and other critically important targets to degrade German command and control over the whole front. The noted German artillery commander, Georg Bruchmüller, having served opposite Brusilov's Front at this time, would learn from and adapt these tactics when planning the preparatory bombardment for Operation Michael on the Western Front in 1918. Brusilov was not even concerned with securing a tremendous local advantage in manpower, permitting divisions under his command to be transferred to other Fronts (so long as they attacked in support of his offensive).

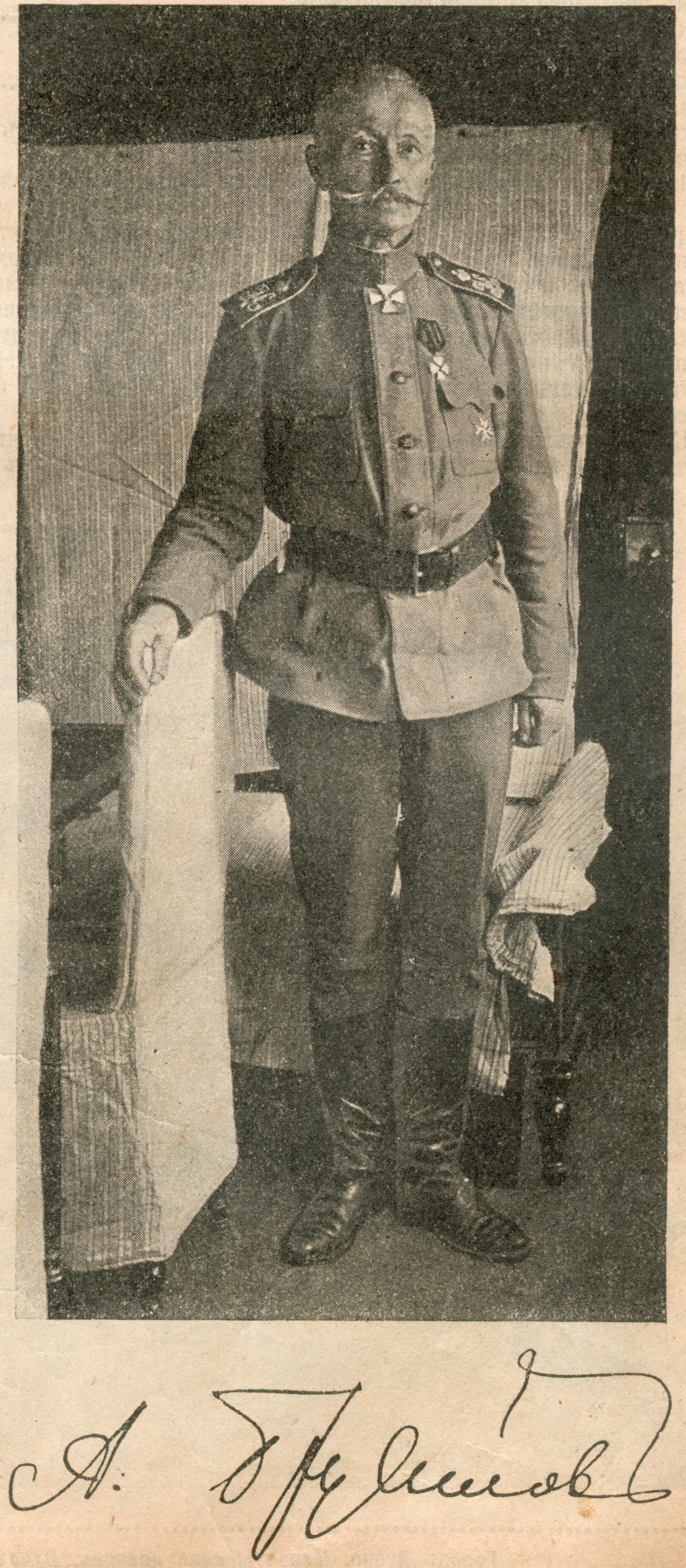
Brusilov in 1916

Brusilov's new techniques were, by First World War standards, highly successful and over the next 3 months, Southwest Front advanced an average of more than 30 kilometres along a front of more than 400 kilometres (250 mi), taking 450,000 Austro-Hungarian prisoners in the process. However, the planned supporting attack from West Front (the Army group to Brusilov's north) was not delivered, and Germany was able to transfer 17 divisions from France and Belgium to halt the Russian advance.

Brusilov was awarded the Sword of Saint George with Diamonds for his greatest victory, one of only 8 Russian commanders to receive this award during the First World War.

From 27 June to 3 July 1916, Brusilov carried out, on his own initiative, the deportation of 13,000 German civilians from the Volhynian areas that had been conquered during the offensive.

=== 1917 and Revolution ===
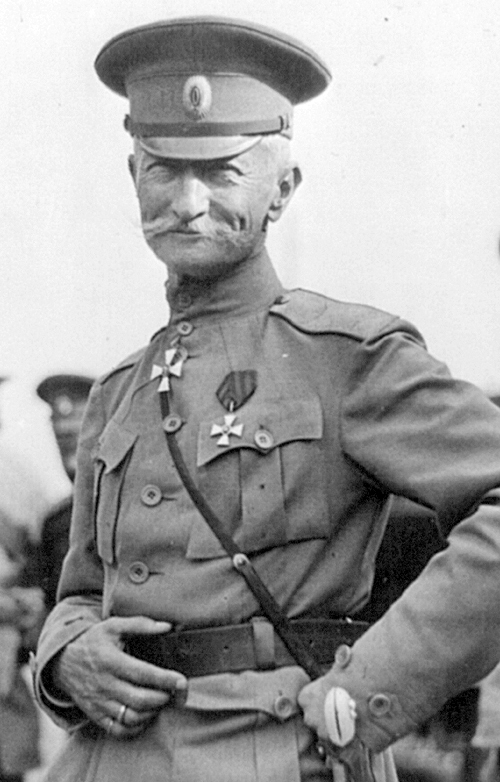
Brusilov in 1917

Brusilov was sure that after the failure of 1905 the revolutionaries will try to take revenge, Brusilov thought that in peacetime he would support the people, but during the greatest war in history he considered it unnecessary to weaken the situation and the army. Alekseev telegraphed Brusilov that if he did not send a telegram to the tsar asking him to abdicate, then all supplies of equipment would be closed to him, which would have rendered his troops combat ineffective. Brusilov reluctantly agreed, later regretting his action.

On 4 June [O.S. 22 May] 1917, Brusilov was appointed Commander in Chief of the Russian Army.

Throughout this period, Brusilov proved sympathetic to revolutionary aspirations, though his primary concern was that the war needed to be won first. In particular, he asserted that until peace was achieved, the full authority of the central government must be respected and that the army should maintain the full rigour of its disciplinary code. In a telegram to the Minister of War, Alexander Kerensky, he wrote, "... only the application of capital punishment will stop the decomposition of army and will save freedom and our homeland".

Brusilov tried to do everything to stop the disintegration of the army, he ordered the killing of Bolsheviks at the front and in the rear in order to stop the propaganda of peace. He actively supported the shock troops who fulfilled the purpose of the overseers destroying all revolutionary contagion.

This unpopular stand, together with the failure of the Kerensky Offensive in July 1917, led to Brusilov's replacement as Commander in Chief by his former deputy, Lavr Kornilov. Brusilov moved to Moscow and remained there at the disposal of the Russian Provisional Government. He gave an excellent praising to Tomáš Masaryk for Czechoslovak Legion soldiers after Battle of Zborov in July 1917. When fighting broke out in Moscow following the October Revolution, he was severely wounded in the foot by a fragment of a shell that hit his bathroom.

== Soviet Russia ==
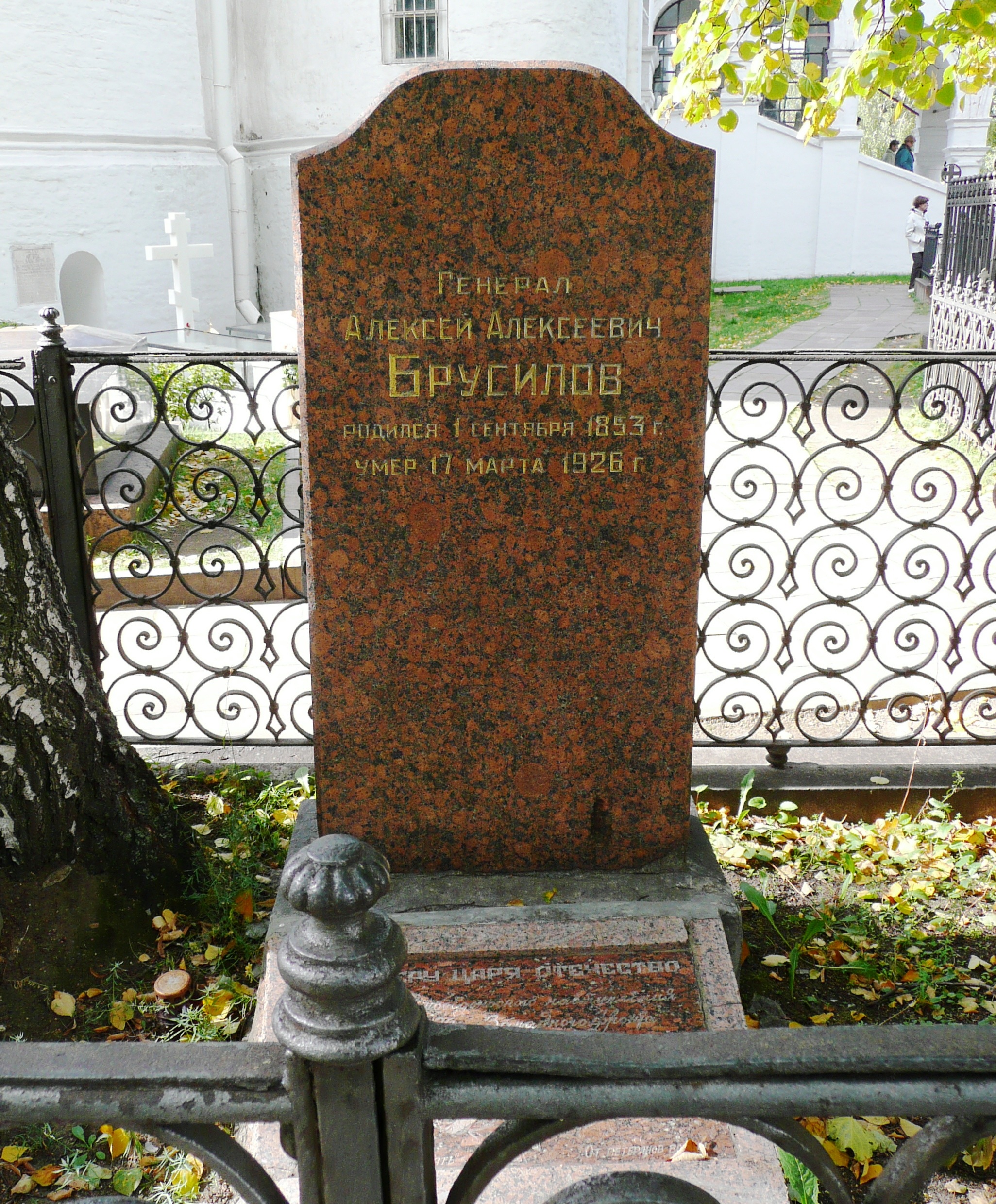
Brusilov's grave near the 500-year-old katholikon of the Novodevichy Convent (in the background)

Because some of his former soldiers were serving in the newly formed Red Army, Brusilov concurred that radical change was necessary. Brusilov saw cooperation with the Soviet state as a way to hold the territory of the former Russian Empire together in the interests of the Russian nation. Privately, he expressed the hope that the communist system would pass and be replaced by a Russian nation-state. He accused exiled White emigrants and the White movement overall of putting their class interests above the interests of the Russian nation.

On 30 May 1920, during the Polish Eastern offensive of the Polish-Soviet War, he published in Pravda an appeal entitled "To All Former Officers, Wherever They Might Be," encouraging anti-Bolshevik Russians to forgive past grievances and join the Red Army. Brusilov considered it a patriotic duty for all Russian officers to join hands with the Bolshevik government, which in his opinion was defending Russia against foreign invaders. On 12 September 1920, Mikhail Kalinin, Vladimir Lenin, Leon Trotsky, Sergey Kamenev and Brusilov signed an appeal, "To all officers of the army of Baron Wrangel," in which they called on White Army officers to go over to the side of the Russian Soviet Republic. In the document, they accused Wrangel of acting in the interests of the Polish nobility and the Anglo-French capitalists, who they believed had used the Wrangel army to enslave the Russian people (as had happened with the Czechoslovak corps and the "black-skinned divisions").

Initially, Brusilov served on a special commission to determine the size and structure of the Red Army. Later, he led cavalry recruit training and became Inspector of Cavalry. He retired in 1924 but continued to carry out commissions for the Revolutionary Military Council.

Aged seventy upon his retirement, he lived in his shared apartment with his sickly wife and another couple. He died in Moscow from congestive heart failure, and was given an honourable state funeral, buried in the Novodevichy Convent, by representatives from the 'new Russia' (the Bolsheviks), and the 'old Russia' (the clergy, the middle and upper class). His second wife Nadezhda Brusilova-Zhelikhova (1864–1938) is buried in the Orthodox section of the Olšany Cemetery in Prague, along with a number of other members of the Russian emigration.

== Legacy ==
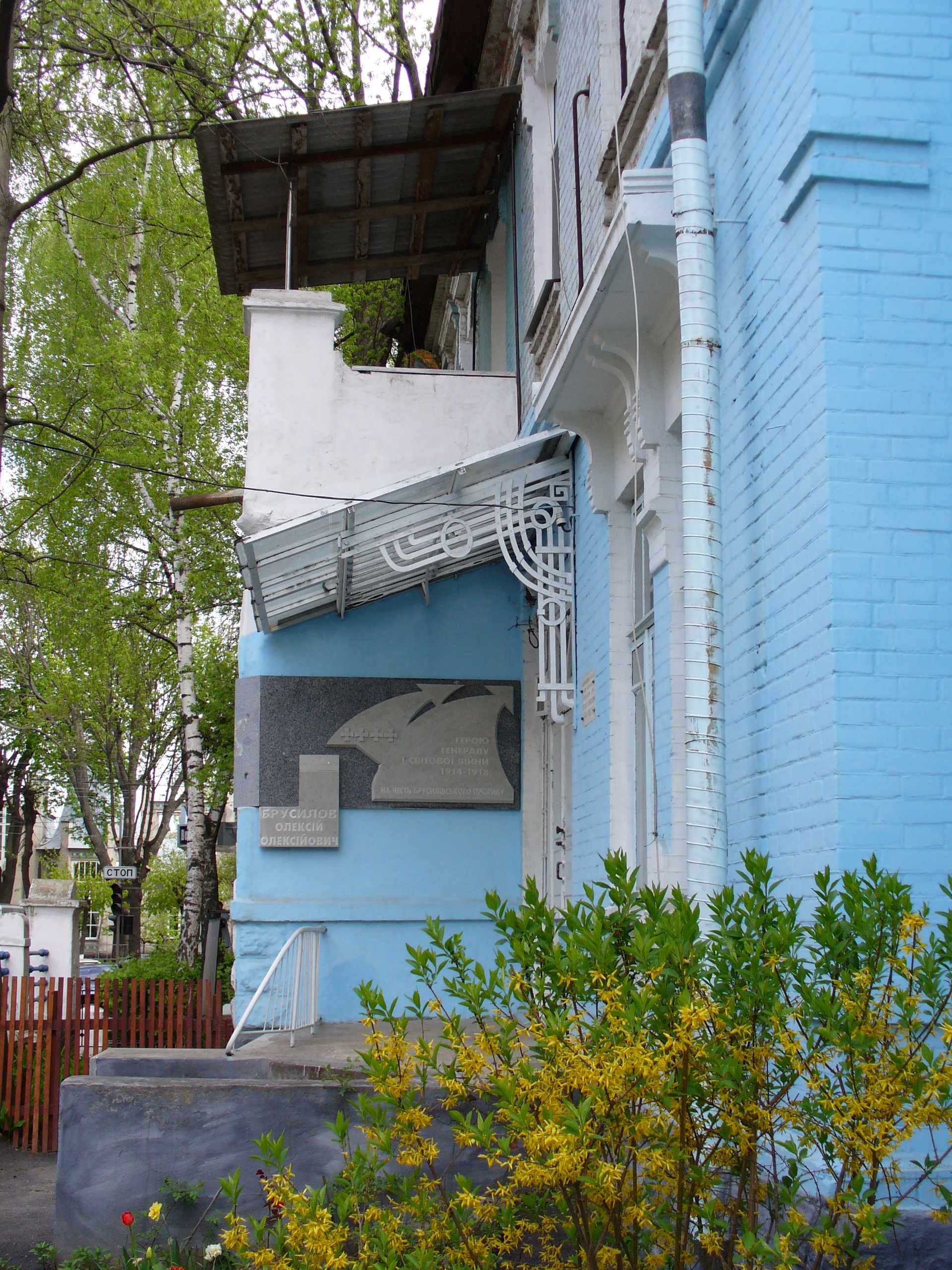
Aleksei Brusilov's house in Vinnytsia

His war memoirs were translated into English and published in 1930 as A Soldier's Notebook, 1914–1918. Following the October Revolution, he served the Bolsheviks and joined the Red Army. Many pro-tsarist historians avoided praising or even mentioning his historical role, because of his role in the Red Army. Denikin, for example, a participant in the 1916 offensive and later a leading White commander, portrayed Brusilov as a ditherer who, at a critical moment in the 1916 offensive, "suffered a curious psychological breakdown" and ordered a needless retreat spurred by "imaginary dangers of the enemy breaking through."

The Soviet government also notes Brusilov's extreme counterrevolutionary views:

The manuscript of “Memoirs”, which we received in the archive, written by the hand of Brusilov’s wife (N. Brusilova) and signed by A. Brusilov himself during his and his wife’s stay in Carlsbad in 1925, contains sharp attacks against the Bolshevik party, personally against V. I. Lenin and other party leaders (Dzerzhinsky), against the Soviet government and the Soviet people, leaving no doubt about the double-dealing of General Brusilov and his counter-revolutionary views, which did not leave him until his death.

— The initial CGVIA of the USSR Major Shlyapnikov.

Brusilov can also be described as an ardent Germanophobe, which is confirmed by the entries in his memoirs and actions in Galicia:

All my life I have felt and known that the German government and the Germans are the irreconcilable and strongest enemies of my homeland and my people, they always wanted to enslave us no matter what it cost them; this was confirmed by the last war. No matter what Wilhelm II wrote in his memoirs, we did not start this war, but they did; everyone knows well how they hate us, and not the other way around. In this regard, it is understandable that my hatred for them is visible through the pages of my memories.

— Brusilov.

== Assessment ==
According to the assessment of British Field Marshal Bernard Montgomery, Brusilov was one of the seven outstanding fighting commanders of World War I, the others being Erich von Falkenhayn (later replaced by Paul von Hindenburg), Erich Ludendorff, Mustafa Kemal, Herbert Plumer, John Monash and Edmund Allenby.

== Honours and awards ==
Russian

- Order of St. Anna, 3rd Class, 1878; 2nd Class, 1883; 1st Class, 1909
- Order of Saint Stanislaus, 3rd Class with Swords and Bow, 1878; 2nd Class with Swords, 1878; 1st Class, 1903
- Order of St. Vladimir, 4th Class, 6 December 1895; 3rd Class, 1898; 2nd Class, 1913
- Order of St. George, 4th Class, 23 August 1914; 3rd Class, 18 September 1914
- Golden St. George weapons, 27 October 1915; with Diamonds, 20 July 1916

Foreign

- Order of the Lion and the Sun, Knight, 1874 (Persian Empire)
- Order of the Golden Star of Bukhara, Knight 2nd Class, 1896 (Emirate of Bukhara)
- Legion d'Honneur, Grand Officer, 1897 (French Third Republic)
- Order of the Red Eagle, Knight 2nd Class, 1898 (Kingdom of Prussia)
- Order of Karađorđe's Star (Kingdom of Yugoslavia)

== Bibliography ==
- Lohr, Eric (2003). Nationalizing the Russian Empire: The Campaign against Enemy Aliens during World War I. London: Harvard University Press. ISBN 0-674-01041-8.
- Брусилов, Алексей (2023). Мои воспоминания. Из царской армии в Красную (in Russian). Moscow: Москва. ISBN 978-5-04-176827-0.
