= 3rd Army (Russian Empire) =

World War I Russian field army

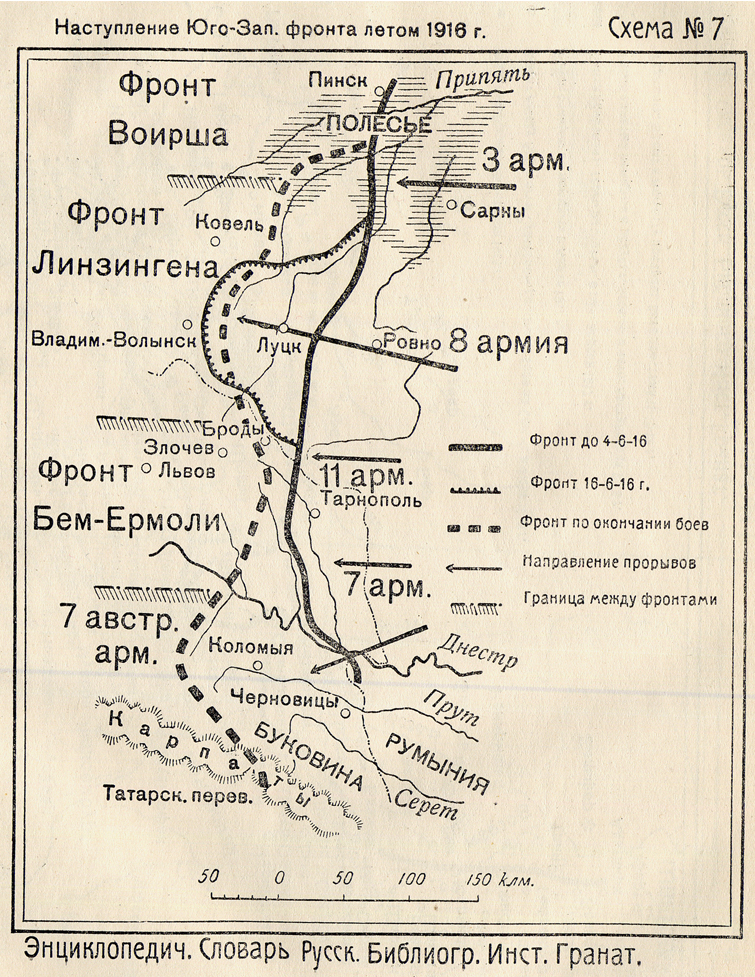
Offensive of the Russian South-Western front (Brusilov offensive). 1916

The Russian Third Army was a World War I Russian field army that fought on the Eastern theatre of war.

Field management was established in July 1914 at the headquarters of the Kiev Military District. The unit was disbanded in the beginning of 1918. At the beginning of the war the 3rd Army was composed of the IX, X, XI, XXI Army Corps.

A detachment of two aircraft "Ilya Muromets" was based at the Bereza airfield, from the 4th aviation company based at the airfield Lida. The detachment operated jointly with the 3rd Army from February 1915 and, in addition to Bereza, was also based at airfields in Brest-Litovsk and Slutsk.

== Military Fronts in which the 3rd Army participated ==
- Southwestern Front (July 1914 – June 1915)
- Northwestern Front (June–Aug. 1915)
- Western Front (August 1915 – June 1916)
- Southwestern Front (June–July 1916)
- Western Front (July 1916 – the beginning of 1918)

=== Mobilisation ===
The Third Army was originally based in Dubno. It comprised four Army Corps and three cavalry divisions, with the 3rd Caucasian Division joining them later. They were part of the invasion of Galicia, with the first stop for the staff officers was at Penyaki where they were made welcome by the servants of a house owned by a major in the Austrian Army. The building was set on fire by unknown people following their departure for Zolochev. Here the Army HQ was accommodated in a three-storey stone building which had previously been a bank.

=== Engagements ===
- Battle of Gnila Lipa (26–30 August, 1914)
- Battle of Limanowa (1–13 December, 1914)

== Commanders ==
- 19.07.1914 – 03.09.1914 — General of Infantry Nikolai Ruzsky
- 03.09.1914 – 20.05.1915 — General of Infantry Radko Dimitriev
- 03.06.1915 – 03.08.1917 — General of Infantry Leonid Lesh
- 03.08.1917 – 11.08.1917 — Lieutenant-General Mikhail Kvetsinsky
- 11.08.1917 – 09.09.1917 — Lieutenant-General Januarius Tsikhovich
- 12.09.1917 – 09.10.1917 — Lieutenant-General Ilia Odishelidze
- 09.09.1917 – 08.11.1917 — Lieutenant-General Dmitri Parsky
- 08.11.1917 — Sergey Anuchin

== See also ==
- List of Imperial Russian Army formations and units
