= Riga–Šiauliai offensive =

1915 German offensive on the Eastern Front of World War I

- Part of the Eastern Front of World War I
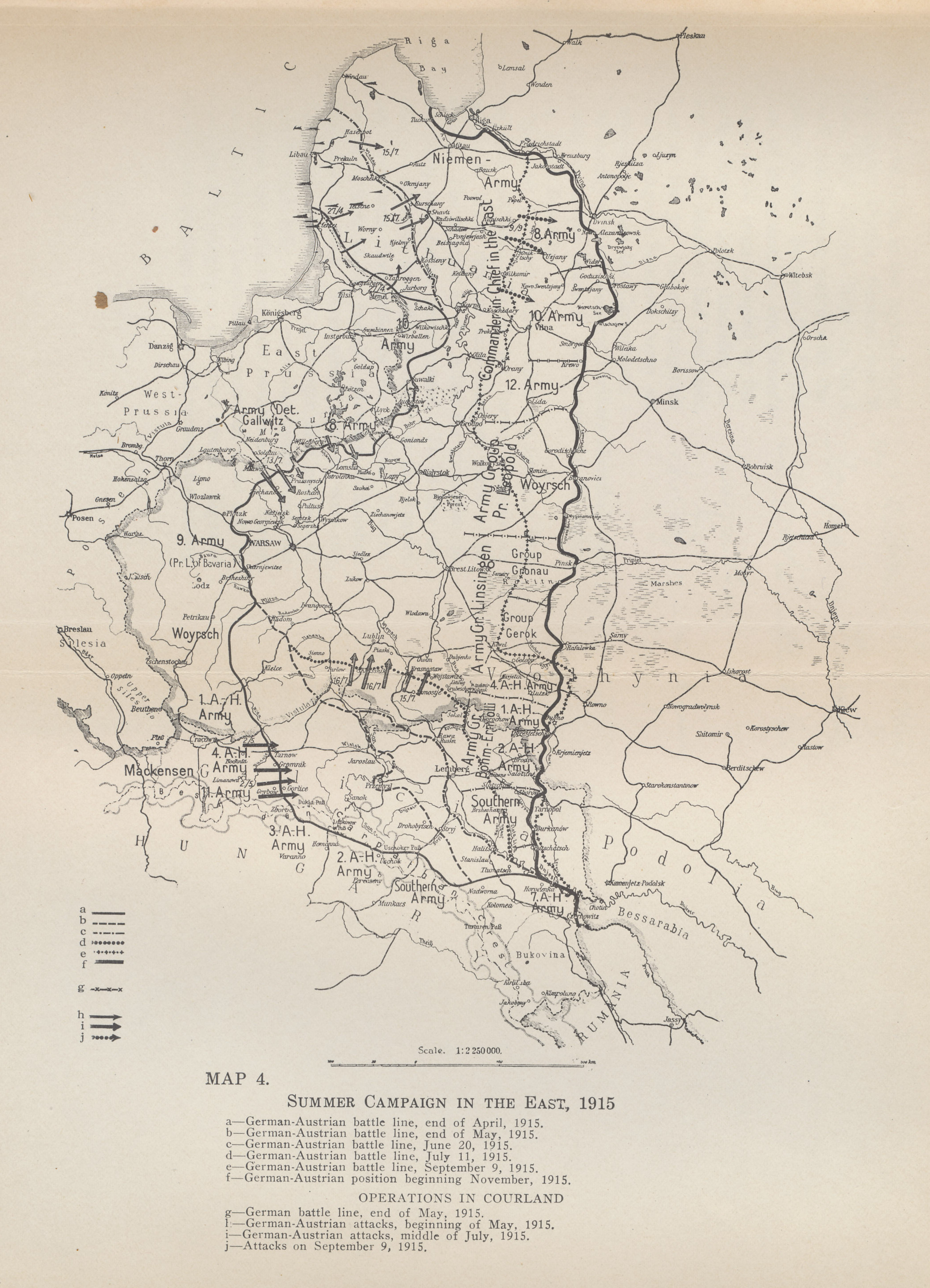
- German summer offensive in the Eastern Front 1915
Date	14 July – 28 August 1915
Location	Riga and Šiauliai area
Result	German victory
Territorial changes	Most of Courland and Lithuania occupied by the Imperial German Army

Belligerents
German Empire	Russian Empire

Commanders and leaders
(German Empire) Paul von Hindenburg (German Empire) Erich Ludendorff (German Empire) Otto von Below (German Empire) Otto von Lauenstein (German Empire) Manfred von Richthofen	Mikhail Alekseyev; Pavel Plehve

Units involved
(German Empire) Army of the Niemen	5th Army

Strength
Total: 326,615 men Army of the Niemen; 158,905 men 600 guns X Army; 167,710 men	Total: 549,192 men 5th Army; 217,041 men 290 machine guns 488 guns 10th Army: 332,151 men 305 machine guns 784 guns

Casualties and losses
Total: 38,176 men 9,061 KIA; 4,337 MIA; 24,778 WIA	Total: 157,224 men 14,025 KIA; 81,886 MIA; 61,314 WIA

The Riga–Šiauliai offensive (German: Offensive in Kurland; Russian: Риго-Шавельская операция) was a major Imperial German Army offensive, launched by Paul von Hindenburg with his Army of the Niemen, to divert Russian forces from the direction of the main German blow of the summer offensive on Narew. However, it gradually changed into an offensive of two German armies to capture the Kaunas Fortress and reach the Daugava. In the course of a successful offensive, the German army defeated the numerically superior Russian forces and reached the approaches of Riga, which was a strategically important city.

== Background ==
Together with the Bug–Narew Offensive of the Max von Gallwitz's Army Group on the Narew and August von Mackensen's Army Group between the Vistula and the Bug Rivers, the Army of the Niemen of the Paul von Hindenburg's army group carried out an operation against the right flank of the Russian Northwestern Front, in fact continuing the active operations begun on the Riga direction at the end of April 1915. This operation was undertaken at the insistence of the Supreme Commander of All German Forces in the East (Ober Ost) - Paul von Hindenburg and his Chief of the Staff Erich Ludendorff, contrary to the negative opinion of Chief of the German Great General Staff, Erich von Falkenhayn. The result of intense disputes was a compromise decision on the distracting nature of the new offensive on the Neman and in Courland, which was more in line with both the more complex natural environment (the area abounded in rivers, forests and swamps), and the importance attached by the Russian command to Riga and the Daugava River. For the Supreme Commander of All German Forces in the East, the main goal of the actions was the envelopment and final capture of the Kaunas Fortress, which supported the Russian battle formations on the Neman - close to the German border.

== Comparison of strength ==
For the offensive on Riga, the Army of the Niemen under Infantry General Otto von Below (Chief of Staff, Major General Alfred von Böckmann) had 158,905 soldiers and officers and 600 guns in service, including only 50 heavy ones, and was operationally subdivided into the strong von Lauenstein's Northern Group and von Richthofen's Southern Group. The first received the task of advancing to the highway from Šiauliai to Jelgava and through Kuldīga to Tukun: the second went on the offensive a few days later, linking the Russian troops along the front.

On the Russian side, from the mouth of the Dubysa River to the Baltic coast, the 5th Army of Cavalry General Paul Plehve (chief of staff, Lieutenant General Yevgeny Miller) occupied fortified positions - 217,041 men. Russian troops outnumbered the Germans in manpower and were inferior in artillery (superior in heavy) and, possibly, in machine guns. Experiencing interruptions in the supply of ammunition, like the rest of the Russian armies, the 5th Army was able to dispose of reserves of fortresses and had more opportunities to hold the front.

== Russian counteroffensive near Riga ==
=== August 2–3 ===
On August 2, the commander of the German 10th Army sent his chief of staff E. Hell to Lötzen to convince the Ober Ost of the need to reinforce the army with at least one division to take Kaunas. Hindenburg promised Hell that the 6th Landwehr Brigade would be transferred from the 8th Army, the Landsturm Regiment and several heavy and super-heavy batteries from the 9th Army, and the Beckman Division would be returned from the Army of the Niemen. The next day, Hindenburg managed to convince Falkenhayn of the importance and possibility of a quick capture of Kaunas; the Supreme High Command allocated the required number of shells for the operation.

On August 2–3, the Army of the Niemen pursued the retreating corps of the Russian 5th Army, capturing 3,250 prisoners and 2 machine guns. After receiving the order to turn the army to Vilnius, O. von Below ordered to stop the pursuit, go on the defensive in the Riga direction, leaving only the 29th Landwehr and the 3rd and 18th Cavalry Brigades here, and send the infantry divisions to the south. To counter the German offensive on Riga, on August 3, Plehve entrusted the defence of the Riga fortified area to Lieutenant General N. Lisovsky, subordinating the 7th Siberian Army Corps to him, and ordered Lieutenant General G. Troubetzkoy to strike at the flank and rear of the Mitava's group.

=== August 4–7 ===
Due to the retreat of the 19th Army Corps on the night of August 4, Plehve withdrew the 5th Army's other corps. Having received information about the transfer of part of the German troops from Riga, Plehve ordered his troops on August 5 to launch a counteroffensive. In stubborn fighting during the day, the Russians made little progress. The headquarters of the Army of the Niemen regarded the increase in the activity of the Russian side as an attempt to cover the flanks of the army. On August 7, the troops of the Riga fortified area entrenched themselves on the right bank of the Iecava River. In two days, only 40 prisoners were taken.

The offensive of the Army of the Niemen intended to strike at Ukmergė, concentrating three infantry divisions near Panevėžys, but it was necessary to replenish troops and ammunition. At the same time, the chief of staff of the Russian 5th Army, Miller, informed the chief of staff of the armies of the Northwestern Front, A. Gulevich, that with the army sector stretched over 250 versts, “there are absolutely no means to directly cover the paths to Vilnius and Švenčionys". Therefore, he considered the creation of intermediate strongholds unsuitable for the situation and urged that all forces and means be urgently sent to build fortifications in front of Daugava.

=== August 8–12 ===
After midnight on August 8, Plehve, dissatisfied with the results of the battles, ordered G. Troubetzkoy to personally lead the attack. By the night of August 9, the offensive was a complete success. During the day, more than 50 prisoners and 3 machine guns were captured. On August 9, the 5th Army continued its onslaught on the German center, repelling attempts to advance in the area of the Riga fortified area. In the sectors of the Russian 19th and 3rd Army Corps, the Russian offensive developed successfully. By the morning of August 11, the Army of the Niemen still maintained positions on the Lielupe and Iecava Rivers. Attempts by the Germans to go on the offensive on the front of the Riga fortified area were repulsed by them with the help of gunboats.

On the afternoon of August 12, in the Riga region, the 13th Siberian Rifle Division launched an offensive towards the Lielupe and knocked out the Germans from the right bank. Plehve, around midnight on August 13, was ordered to Troubetzkoy and M. Grabbe with a concentrated blow to break through the positions of the Germans, and the 3rd and 19th Army Corps to strengthen their positions and conduct active reconnaissance, and in the event of an Germans retreat, vigorously pursue him.

=== August 13–15 ===
On August 13, the Russian 5th Army again attacked the German positions and was met with stubborn resistance and counterattacks. If the 37th Army Corps and the 4th Cavalry Division moved forward and occupied Vecmēmele Manor, then the 1st and 2nd Cavalry Divisions were pushed back beyond the Rovėja river, and the Grabbe's Detachment was not successful. Ordered by Plehve, from 17:00 the 19th and 3rd Army corps went on the offensive. Before nightfall, they managed to get within 300-600 paces of the German positions. The detachment of N. Kaznakov, having suffered significant losses from cannon and machine-gun fire from behind the Šventoji River, retreated. On the night of August 14, Plehve replaced the temporary commander of the 37th Army Corps, Lieutenant General G. Levitsky, with Major General Januarius Tsikhovich, and Troubetzkoy's Detachment was disbanded, leaving only the 1st and 2nd Cavalry Divisions under his command.

On August 14, the 5th Army resumed the offensive. Until nightfall, the right wing of the army advanced successfully but slowly. The cavalry corps of Troubetzkoy and the detachment of Grabbe were pinned down by the attacks of the German V Cavalry Corps. The offensive of the 19th and 3rd Army Corps developed successfully until noon, but then the German I Cavalry Corps and the 78th Reserve Division launched a counterattack on the left flank of the 3rd Army Corps, after which, at about 17:00, Plehve allowed the corps to withdraw, and ordered the cavalry on the flanks to hit the Germans in the rear. However, the blow did not work, the German I Reserve and I Cavalry Corps continued to push the Russian units, which retreated by the morning of August 15 across the Vadva and Jara-Šetekšna rivers.

The stubborn battles with varying success that accompanied the offensive of the Russian 5th Army did not bring Plehve the expected results, but the Riga-Daugava direction was reliably covered, the offensive against Ukmergė, which was being prepared by the Germans, was thwarted, and the divisions ready to be sent against Kaunas were detained to hold the positions of the Neman army. The German 10th Army also could not start an operation against Kaunas in time.

== First Vilnius offensive ==
Since mid-August, the staff of Supreme Commander of All German Forces in the East, considered the idea of developing an offensive in the Neman region - by breaking through to Vilnius and Minsk, which would intercept the withdrawal routes of the armies of the Russian Northwestern Front from Congress Poland. For this, as the chief of staff of the Supreme Commander of All German Forces in the East, Ludendorff, believed, it was necessary to break through the Russian positions in front of the 10th Army and Army of the Niemen, push the Russians back through Vilnius to the Daugava and send the cavalry to raid against Minsk and Polotsk to destroy and intercept the railways in the Russian rear. The right flank of the operation was to be provided by the 8th and 12th Armies with an attack on the Pinsk Marshes. Falkenhayn was against such a plan, considering it impossible either to continue the offensive in winter or to invade deep into Russia: operations in the East were not supposed, as emphasised in the order of August 18, to go further than the line from Brest-Litovsk to Grodno, and "surplus" troops were to be transferred to other theaters. Hindenburg disagreed with this vision of military planning: in the area of Augustów and Suwałki, the front passed too close to the German border. On August 19, he issued a new directive: the 12th and 8th Armies to continue attacks. The 10th Army to develop an offensive with the left wing on Vilnius, covering the Russian troops from the Neman to Druskininkai, with the right wing to advance from Augustów to Grodno. The 4th Cavalry Division and three Landwehr divisions from the disbanded X. von Beseler group entered the army. The Army of the Niemen was entrusted with covering the operation from the north with an offensive against Švenčionys and Riga.

On August 20, the German 10th Army launched an offensive northeast of Kaunas. Litzman's group (115th Infantry, 3rd, 76th and 79th Reserve Divisions) crossed the Neris River and attacked the remnants of the Kaunas garrison. The VI Cavalry Corps occupied Jonava and created the threat of a breakthrough to Vilnius through Ukmergė. Radkevich was also concerned about the situation at the junction with the 1st Army (after the departure of the 12th Army to Riga), where the evacuation of the Osowiec Fortress was being completed: the abandonment of the fortress threatened the 20th Army Corps, which was in an advantageous position, and forced the evacuation of Grodno to also begin. The commander of the 10th Army considered the preservation of positions on the left bank of the Neman "highly desirable and possible."

In the conditions of the German advance to Vilnius, the headquarters of the armies of the Northwestern Front sent the 5th Army Corps to the 10th Army (the Guards Corps, landing in Vilnius, was the reserve of the Russian Supreme Commander). On August 21, Radkevich ordered to prevent the Germans from entering the interfluve of the Neman and Neris rivers and to launch a counterattack with the right wing of the army. However, on August 21, the retreat of the right wing of the Russian 10th Army continued: the onslaught of the German VI Cavalry and XXXX Reserve Corps did not weaken. At 16:00 Radkevich ordered the 2nd and 26th Army Corps to cross the Neman River at night. By evening, it turned out that the right flank of the army was so upset that it could not withstand the attacks of the Germans and retreated. The 3rd Siberian and 2nd Army Corps went beyond the Neman. After the 1st Army abandoned the Osowiec fortress, it was necessary to begin the evacuation of Grodno. The commandant of the fortress, M. Kaigorodov, expected to remove artillery (128 guns), ammunition (300,000 poods of shells and 100,000 poods of gunpowder), engineering and quartermaster supplies (2.2 million poods) from the fortress by September 13 with the condition of supplying at least 289 platforms and 2,908 wagons. At the same time, for lack of time and transport, another 507 guns and 626,000 shells, 53 machine guns, 79 rocket launchers with 6,631 rockets, almost 6 million rifle cartridges and a 10-day supply of food for the 1st and 10th armies were left in Grodno.

In a difficult situation, the chief of staff of the 10th Army, Major General I. Popov, on the night of August 23, turned for help to the commander of the 5th Army, Plehve, to go on the offensive with the left flank to the west. The 20th Army Corps and the Grodno Fortress were transferred by order of the Commander-in-Chief of the armies of the Northwestern Front Alekseyev to the 1st Army. However, the 5th Army's situation was also difficult: from August 20, the Army of the Niemen, with the forces of the V Cavalry and I Reserve Corps, began to push the center of the 5th Army, knocking out the 37th Army Corps from Vecmēmele Manor.

On the morning of August 23, the Germans attacked the detachments of Tsikhovich, Troubetzkoy and Mikhail Grabbe, pushing them back. As a result, the 19th Army Corps and the 3rd Army Corps took up new positions. On August 24, von Schmettov's cavalry, reinforced by the 41st Division with three heavy batteries and the Otto von Homeyer brigade, struck again at the detachments of Troubetzkoy, Tsikhovich and Grabbe; after 16 hours, all three detachments began to withdraw, leaving 700 prisoners in the hands of the Germans. Plehve was forced to send his last reserve, the 1st Nevsky Infantry Regiment, to the 37th Army Corps. At the same time, Tsikhovich ordered to shoot every hundredth of the 315th Glukhovsky Infantry Regiment, two battalions of which fled from their positions.

On August 23, the 10th Army was again attacked by the Germans on the Neman River. After a stubborn battle, the Russian 2nd and the 26th Army Corps withdrew. The guard divisions and the 5th Army Corps, which had begun to arrive in Vilnius and Lentvaris, had to hold the front at Vilnius. On August 24, Radkevich divided his army into two groups:

- the Vilnius group of Lieutenant General Pyotr Baluyev (Guards, 5th and 34th Army Corps), and
- the Neman group of the General of the Infantry B. Flug (3rd Siberian, 2nd and 26th Army Corps).

Despite repeated orders to go on the offensive, the right wing of the 10th Army continued to retreat to Vilnius and to the right bank of the Neman River.

On August 26, the Army of the Niemen continued its offensive against Jaunjelgava by the forces of Lieutenant General Shmettov's group, which continuously attacked the positions of the 37th Army Corps. By the night of August 27, the positions of the Tsikhovich detachment on the Ponemunok River were broken through. Due to heavy losses and the complete breakdown of units, the Russian 37th Army Corps was withdrawn. In order to restore the situation, Plehve ordered to strike at the flanks of the Germans advancing to the Daugava River and go to his rear. In the morning, the chief of staff of the 5th Army, Miller insistently asked to expedite the arrival in Daugavpils of the 28th Army Corps removed from the Southwestern Front; its head trains began to arrive only late in the evening of 27 August.

The offensive of the Russian 19th and 3rd Army Corps against the German I Reserve Corps was unsuccessful. The Ussuri Cossack Cavalry Brigade was withdrawn due to the retreat of the right wing of the 10th Army. By the night of August 28, the Germans captured the first position at Jaunjelgava.

On August 28, Plehve again persistently ordered Trubetskoy, leaving a small barrier, "with the rest of the forces to break through at all costs into the rear of the enemy advancing towards Friedrichstadt." But the defence of the German Army of the Niemen was precisely built on the maximum use of the terrain and villages as base lines and points. On August 28–29, von Schmettov's group was pushed back on the left flank to the Nemenek River, but broke through the second line of defence near Jaunjelgava. Artillery preparation destroyed the positions of the 79th Infantry Division's 2nd Brigade in 20 minutes. However, the Army of the Niemen failed to take Jaunjelgava on the move and capture the bridges on the Daugava.

By August 26, the German 10th Army approached Vilnius from the north and northwest. He managed to push back the mounted barriers of the Russian 10th Army. The Russian 5th Army Corps and the 3rd Siberian Army Corps were forced to retreat; the Russian 2nd and 26th Army Corps' divisions were also withdrawn under the onslaught of the German XXI Corps. On August 27, Radkevich united the 124th Infantry, 2nd Finnish Rifle and Border Composite Divisions under the command of the commander of the 5th Caucasian Army Corps, Lieutenant General Nikolai Istomin, instructing them to fight to the death. The 34th Army Corps' divisions, which had lost their combat effectiveness, were assigned to the reserve.

By evening, the front of the 10th Army's right wing had partially stabilised a few kilometers north and west of Vilnius. But by nightfall, the Germans began to push the 2nd and 26th Army Corps's regiments.

The timely transfer and introduction of eight Russian divisions into battle north of Vilnius frustrated Hindenburg's hopes for a quick (after the fall of Kaunas) capture of this city, which was a major junction of railways and highways. Also, thanks to the active actions of the Russian 5th Army, the Germans failed to capture Jēkabpils and Jaunjelgava on the move. By this time, as the chief commander of the Dvina military district, engineer-general N. Tumanov, reported to the staff of the Northwestern Front, work on the creation of the Dvina and Vilnius's fortified positions was almost completely completed. On the first two, 30% of dugouts and shelters remained unfinished, on Daugavpils - another 10% of the barriers, but it was already possible to deploy troops. This facilitated the adoption of further decisions on the defence of Russian positions and on stopping the Great Retreat.

== Outcome ==
German troops during the operation captured up to 51,000 prisoners, 1,326 guns (mainly in Kaunas) and 40 machine guns. The ratio of losses (killed and missing) was 1 to 5 in favor of the German Imperial Army.

In the July battles, the Germans managed to disorient the command of the armies of the Russian Northwestern Front (M. Alekseyev) and Headquarters, which caused the transfer of an entire army to the middle course of the Neman and to Riga. But in August, the Russian troops managed, actively defending themselves, to prevent the enemy from reaching the right bank of the Daugava and Vilnius. The Russians captured 1,302 German prisoners and 9 machine guns. At the same time, major Russian failures in operations in this direction were the loss of control over the western part of the Gulf of Riga, the coast of Courland, the capture by the German troops of the Kaunas Fortress with its artillery and supplies.

== See also ==
- Siege of Kaunas
