= List of battles with most Russian military fatalities =

This article contains a list of battles and military campaigns with most Russian military deaths.

== Introduction ==
This article lists battles and campaigns in which the number of Russian military fatalities exceed 1,000. The term casualty in warfare refers to a soldier who is no longer fit to fight after being in combat. Casualties can include killed, wounded, missing, captured or deserted.

== Battles ==
Battle or siege	Conflict	Date	Estimated number killed	Opposing force	References
Battle of Tannenberg	World War I	August 23 to 30, 1914	32,458 killed (Note: 5,522 confirmed dead and 26,936 likely dead)	(German Empire) Germany	
Battle of Łódź (1914)	World War I	November 11 to December 6, 1914	25,000 killed	(German Empire) Germany; Austria-Hungary	
Battle of Humin-Bolimów	World War I	January 14 to February 28, 1915	17,385 killed	(German Empire) Germany	
Battle of Berezina	French invasion of Russia	November 26 to 29, 1812	10,000 killed	(First French Empire) France (Duchy of Warsaw) Poland (Kingdom of Italy (Napoleonic)) Italy (Kingdom of Naples) Naples (Kingdom of Bavaria) Bavaria (Kingdom of Westphalia) Westphalia (Kingdom of Württemberg) Württemberg (Kingdom of Saxony) Saxony (Grand Duchy of Hesse) Hesse	
Siege of Silistria (1854)	Crimean War	May 11 to June 23, 1854	10,000 killed	Ottoman Empire	
Battle of Mukden	Russo-Japanese War	February 20 to March 10, 1905	8,705 killed	(Empire of Japan) Japan	
Siege of Silistra (1773)	Russo-Turkish War (1768–1774)	June 18 to 29, 1773	Over 8,000 killed (Note: 8,000 killed on June 18 only per Austrian historian Joseph von Hammer-Purgstall)	Ottoman Empire	
Siege of Kaunas	World War I	August 12 to 18, 1915	8,000 killed (Note: Estimates range from 7,000 to 8,000 killed)	(German Empire) Germany	
Second Battle of the Masurian Lakes	World War I	February 7 to 28, 1915	7,402 killed	(German Empire) Germany	
Battle of Mărășești	World War I	August 6 to September 3, 1917	7,083 killed	(German Empire) Germany; Austria-Hungary	
Battle of Lode	Livonian War	January 23, 1573	7,000 killed	(Swedish Empire) Sweden	
Siege of Port Arthur	Russo-Japanese War	August 1, 1904 to January 2, 1905	6,000 killed	(Empire of Japan) Japan	
Second Battle of Bolimów	World War I	May 31 to July 7, 1915	5,196 killed (Note: 1,800 in combat and 3,396 due to poison gas)	(German Empire) Germany	
Battle of Shaho	Russo-Japanese War	October 5 to 17, 1904	5,084 killed	(Empire of Japan) Japan	
Battle of Tsushima	Russo-Japanese War	May 27 to 28, 1905	5,045 killed (Note: 216 officers and 4,614 sailors)	(Empire of Japan) Japan	
Siege of Brăila (1809)	Russo-Turkish War (1806–1812)	April 20 to May 28, 1809	5,000 killed (Note: Estimates range from 3,000 to 5,000)	Ottoman Empire	
Siege of Izmail	Russo-Turkish War (1787–1792)	December 2, 1790	4,000 killed	Ottoman Empire	
Battle of Liaoyang	Russo-Japanese War	August 25 to September 3, 1904	3,611 killed	(Empire of Japan) Japan	
Battle of the Chernaya	Crimean War	August 16, 1855	3,330 killed	(United Kingdom of Great Britain and Ireland) United Kingdom; Kingdom of Sardinia; Ottoman Empire	
Battle of Inkerman	Crimean War	November 5, 1854	3,286 killed	(United Kingdom of Great Britain and Ireland) United Kingdom (Second French Empire) France	
Battle of Lesnaya	Great Northern War	October 9, 1708	3,000 killed (Note: Estimates range from 1,111 to 3,000)	(Swedish Empire) Sweden	
First Battle of Plevna (part of the Siege of Plevna)	Russo-Turkish War (1877–1878)	July 19 to 20, 1877	2,845 killed (Note: 74 officers and 2,771 soldiers)	Ottoman Empire	
Battle of Kulevicha	Russo-Turkish War (1828–1829)	June 11, 1829	2,000 killed	Ottoman Empire	
Battle of Gemauerthof	Great Northern War	July 26, 1705	2,000 killed	(Swedish Empire) Sweden	
Siege of Polotsk (1579)	Livonian War	August 11 to August 30, 1579	2,000 killed	Polish–Lithuanian Commonwealth	
Battle of Sandepu	Russo-Japanese War	January 25 to 29, 1905	1,727 killed	(Empire of Japan) Japan	
Siege of Bender (1770)	Russo-Turkish War (1768–1774)	July 26 to September 27, 1770	1,700 killed	Ottoman Empire	
Battle of Poltava	Great Northern War	July 8, 1709	1,572 killed (Note: Estimates range from 1,345 to 1,572)	(Swedish Empire) Sweden; Cossack Hetmanate (Note: Cossacks led by Ivan Mazepa sided with the Swedish Empire)	
Battle of Kushliki	Polish–Russian War (1654–1667)	November 4, 1661	1,500 killed	Polish–Lithuanian Commonwealth	
Battle of Champaubert	War of the Sixth Coalition	February 10, 1814	1,400 killed	(First French Empire) France	
Battle of Grozny (1994–1995)	First Chechen War	December 22, 1994 to March 6, 1995	1,376 killed	Chechen Republic of Ichkeria	
Siege of Azov (1736)	Russo-Turkish War (1735–1739)	March 30, 1736 to July 8, 1736	1,250 killed	Ottoman Empire	
Battle of Krasnokutsk–Gorodnoye	Great Northern War	February 21, 1709	1,200 killed	(Swedish Empire) Sweden	
Battle of Shipka Pass	Russo-Turkish War (1877–1878)	July 17, 1877 to January 9, 1878	1,122 killed	Ottoman Empire	
Battle of Erastfer	Great Northern War	January 9, 1702	1,000 killed	(Swedish Empire) Sweden	
Siege of Erivan (1808)	Russo-Persian War (1804–1813)	October to November, 1808	1,000 killed	Qajar Iran	

== Campaigns ==
Campaign	Conflict	Date	Estimated number killed	Opposing force	References
Gorlice–Tarnów offensive	World War I	May 2 to July 13, 1915	118,112 killed	(German Empire) Germany; Austria-Hungary	
Great Retreat	World War I	July 13 to September 19, 1915	Over 96,820 killed (Note: 96,820 killed between July 13 and August 28 only)	(German Empire) Germany; Austria-Hungary	
Carpathian Campaign	World War I	January 14 to April 24, 1915	~69,436 killed (Note: 570 officers and 68,866 soldiers between January 14 and May 1)	(German Empire) Germany; Austria-Hungary	
Brusilov offensive	World War I	June 4 to September 20, 1916	62,155 killed	(German Empire) Germany; Austria-Hungary; Ottoman Empire	
Vilno-Dvinsk offensive	World War I	August 29 to November 30, 1915	53,173 killed	(German Empire) Germany	
Rovno offensive	World War I	August 27 to October 15, 1915	41,205 killed	(German Empire) Germany; Austria-Hungary	
Kerensky offensive	World War I	July 1 to 19, 1917	~40,000 killed (Note: Estimates range from 6,905 to 40,000)	(German Empire) Germany; Austria-Hungary; Ottoman Empire	
Vistula–Bug offensive (part of the Great Retreat)	World War I	July 14 to August 28, 1915	39,654 killed	(German Empire) Germany; Austria-Hungary	
Bug–Narew offensive (part of the Great Retreat)	World War I	July 13 to August 27, 1915	37,987 killed	(German Empire) Germany	
Russian invasion of East Prussia (1914)	World War I	August 17 to September 14, 1914	24,589 killed (Note: Official Russian medical report)	(German Empire) Germany	
Caucasus campaign	World War I	October 29, 1914 to October 30, 1918	22,000 killed	Ottoman Empire	
Riga–Šiauliai offensive	World War I	July 14 to August 28, 1915	14,025 killed	(German Empire) Germany	
First Riga offensive (part of the Riga–Šiauliai offensive)	World War I	July 14 to 31, 1915	6,482 killed	(German Empire) Germany	
2023 Ukrainian counteroffensive	Russian Invasion of Ukraine	June 4 to December 31, 2023	Over 3,755 killed (Note: 3,755 confirmed by name)	Ukraine	
Erzurum offensive (part of the Caucasus campaign)	World War I	January 10 to February 16, 1916	2,339 killed	Ottoman Empire	
Campaign of Dobruja	Russo-Turkish War (1806–1812)	April 8 to September 4, 1809	2,229 killed	Ottoman Empire	
Bergmann Offensive (part of the Caucasus campaign)	World War I	November 2 to November 21, 1914	1,000 killed	Ottoman Empire (German Empire) Germany	

== Bibliography ==
- Kinglake, A.W. (1863). Invasion of the Crimea, Volume 5. Edinburgh: Blackwood.
- Nelipovich, Sergey (2022). Русский фронт Первой мировой войны. Потери сторон. 1915 [Russian Front of the First World War. Casualties of the Sides. 1915] (in Russian). ISBN 978-5-91791-447-3.
- Nelipovich, Sergei G. (2023). Два похода. Борьба за Восточную Пруссию в августе-октябре 1914 [Two campaigns. The Struggle for East Prussia in August-October 1914]. Забытые войны России (in Russian). Moscow: Квадрига. ISBN 978-5-91791-376-6.
- Heenan, Louise Erwin (1987). Russian Democracy's Fatal Blunder: The Summer Offensive of 1917. New York: Praeger. ISBN 978-0-275-92829-2.
- Нелипович, Сергей Геннадьевич (2022). Русский фронт Первой мировой войны. Потери сторон 1915 [Russian front of the First World War. Losses of the parties 1915] (in Russian). Moskva: Квадрига. ISBN 978-5-91791-447-3. OCLC 1342447102.
- Chandler, David (1966). The Campaigns of Napoleon. Weidenfeld and Nicolson. ISBN 978-0025236608.
- Corbett, Sir Julian (2015) [1915]. Maritime Operations In The Russo-Japanese War 1904–1905, Vol. 2. Naval Institute Press. ISBN 978-1-59114-198-3.
- Kowner, Rotem (2006). Historical Dictionary of the Russo-Japanese War. The Scarecrow Press. ISBN 0810849275.
- Kernosovsky, Anton (1938). История русской армии: Борьба на Кавказе [History of the Russian army: Struggle in Caucasus] (PDF).
- Oleynikov, Alexei (2024). Великое отступление и стабилизация восточного фронта [The Great Retreat and stabilization of the Eastern Front]. Moscow: Вече. ISBN 978-5-4484-4482-1.
- Nelipovich, Sergei (2021). Лодзинская кампания 1914 года [Lodz campaign 1914]. Moscow: Квадрига. ISBN 978-5-91791-387-2.
- Krotov, Pavel (2014). Полтавская битва: начало великой России [Battle of Poltava: the beginning of great Russia] (in Russian). Лики. ISBN 978-5-903672-13-4.
- Harris, Stephen M. (2018-12-07). British Military Intelligence in the Crimean War, 1854–1856. Routledge. ISBN 978-1-135-24493-4.
- Macphail, Rosslyn (2024-12-30). From Fighting Napoleon to the Scottish Military Academy: The Life of Captain John Orr. Pen and Sword Military. ISBN 978-1-3990-3448-7.
- Bodart, Gaston (1908). Militär-historisches Kriegs-Lexikon (1618-1905). Wien und Leipzig, C. W. Stern.
- Orlov, Nikolay Aleksandrovich (1890). Штурм Измаила Суворовым в 1790 году [The storming of Izmail by Suvorov in 1790] (in Russian). St. Petersburg: Типография Тренке и Фюсно. ISBN 978-5-4460-0232-0.
- Petrov, Andrei Nikolaevich (Andrei Nikolaevich Petrov) (1866). Война России с Турцией и Польскими конфедератами [Russia's War with Turkey and the Polish Confederates] (in Russian). Vol. 2. St.Petersburg: Типография Веймара.
- Nafziger, George (2015). The End of Empire: Napoleon's 1814 Campaign. Solihull, UK: Helion & Company. ISBN 978-1-909982-96-3.
- Carlsson, Einar (1947). Karolinska förbundets årsbok 1947: Krasnokutsk—Gorodnoe—Kolomak (in Swedish). Stockholm: Karolinska förbundet. OCLC 470214638.
- Nordberg, Jöran (1740a). Konung Carl den XII:tes Historia, volume 1 (in Swedish). Stockholm: Pet. Momma. OCLC 256604521.
- Kupisz, Dariusz (2003). Połock 1579 (in Polish). Warszawa, Poland: Dom Wydawniczy Bellona. ISBN 83-11-09708-9.
- Mikaberidze, Alexander (2020). The Napoleonic Wars: A Global History. Oxford University Press. ISBN 978-0199951062.
