= Battle of Kalvarija =

Part of the First World War (1915)

- Part of the Eastern Front during World War I
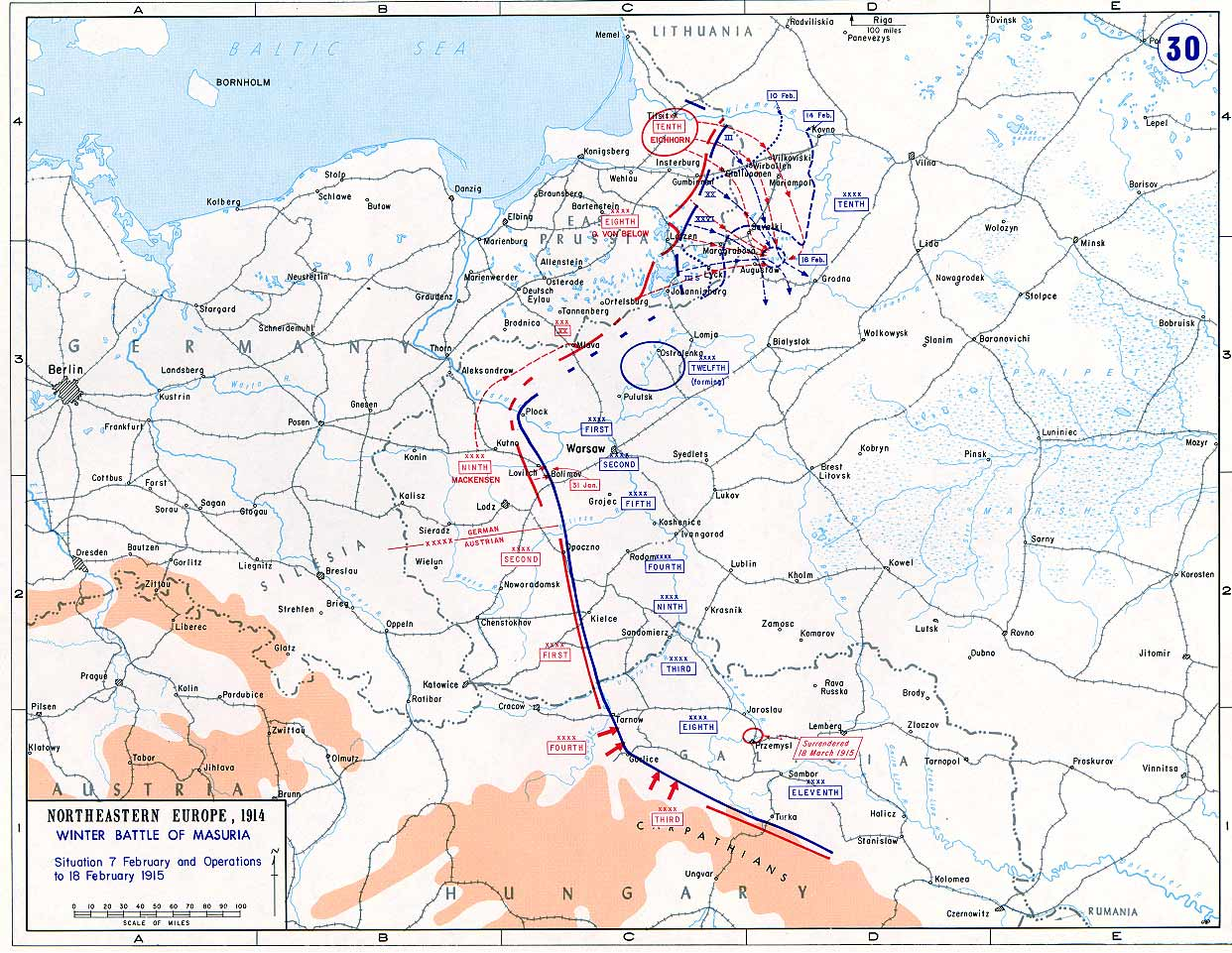
- Eastern Front, March 1915
| Date | 1–12 April 1915 |
| Location | Lithuania |
| Result | Indecisive |

Belligerents
| German Empire | Russian Empire |

Commanders and leaders
| (German Empire) Hermann von Eichhorn | E. Radkevich |

Units involved
| (German Empire) 10th Army | 10th Army |

Strength
| 157,525 men | 269,951 men |

Casualties and losses
| 1–7 April 1915: 1,685 KIA, MIA, WIA; 8–12 April 1915: Unknown | 1–7 April 1915: 4,498 KIA, MIA, WIA; 8–12 April 1915: 5,955 KIA, MIA, WIA |

The Battle of Kalvarija took place between the Imperial German and Russian armies in the spring of 1915 on the territory of modern Lithuania. The Russian 10th Army tried to re-break through the defenses of the German 10th Army after the unsuccessful March offensive.

== Background ==
The German 10th Army, after the March battles with the 10th Russian Army, entrenched itself in positions from the Baltic coast (Palanga) to the Bobr river. At the beginning of April, the German XXI Corps at Kalvarija was replaced by the XL Reserve Corps and occupied a new sector of the front between Rajgród and Wigry. Further to the Wigry Lake, the 77th and 78th Reserve Divisions were located, on the Šešupė River - 1st Cavalry Division, XL Reserve Corps and 16th Landwehr Division - to the Nemunas River. At the turn from Memel to Schmalleningken, holding Palanga and Tauragė on Russian territory, the 6th and 78th Reserve, 3rd, 6th and newly-arrived Bavarian Cavalry Divisions united in the XXXIX Reserve Corps strengthened.

== Battle ==
On April 5, Evgeny Radkevich ordered the completion of the operation to capture Marijampolė and Kalvarija. In the Russian 10th Army at that time there were 269,951 men versus 157,525 Germans. The Russians hoped to finally break the stubborn resistance of the Germans thanks to numerical superiority. The artillery was provided with ammunition at the rate of 252 light, 200 mortar and 209 heavy shells per barrel. But on the day of April 5, the Kovno's detachment near Marijampolė could not overcome the dense small arms and cannon fire and the stubborn resistance of the Germans. The 1st Guards Cavalry Division retreated under the onslaught of the Germans.

On April 6, the German units of the 31st and 42nd Infantry Divisions, despite their small numbers (in the 31st - only 3,000 men), launched a counterattack on the Kovno's detachment. The brigade of the Russian 68th Infantry Division ("which stood for three days in the water versus the German's barriers") retreated from Marijampolė, and the 1st Guards Cavalry Division continued its retreat. The Russian 56th Infantry Division could not withstand the onslaught of the Germans. Only the Russian 73rd Infantry Division and a separate infantry brigade moved forward a little. An attempt to break into the rear of the Germans by the 2nd Guards and 3rd Cavalry Divisions failed. On the site of the Potapov's detachment, the Germans defeated the Ust-Dvinsk battalion (Russians lost 54 killed, 93 wounded, and 9 officers and 320 soldiers were missing). But the counterattack of the Germans did not receive development and was stopped by order of the staff of the Supreme Commander of All German Forces in the East.

Since the beginning of the Easter battles, the Russian 10th Army has lost 646 killed, 2,894 wounded, 958 missing. But the German’s damage was tangible. Only in the XXI Army Corps, 287 men were killed, 724 wounded, 674 missing.

On April 8-11, the fighting continued with varying success. The casualties of the Russian 10th Army for April 8-12 amounted to 1,202 killed, 3,680 wounded, 1,073 missing. 693 prisoners and 8 machine guns were captured.

== Outcome ==
After Easter battle at Kalvarija, on April 13, Radkevich ordered, referring to the "extremely difficult condition of the soil for movement", to stop the offensive and gain a foothold in their positions with the aim of their stubborn defense, and "it is possible for all commanders to personally check the service of their subordinate units more often, in order to weaken vigilance not allow the enemy to break through anywhere in the rear or flank".
