= Great Retreat (disambiguation) =

The Great Retreat was the period on the Western Front following the allied defeat at the Battle of the Frontiers until their counterattack at the First Battle of the Marne between 24 August and 5 September 1914.

Great Retreat may also refer to:

- Great Retreat (Russia), the Russian Army's withdrawal from Poland starting on 22 July 1915
- Great Retreat (Serbia), the evacuation of Serbia in late 1915
- Republic of China retreat to Taiwan, the Republic of China's withdrawal from mainland China to Taiwan in December 1949
- Great Retreat (1930s Russia)
