= Army of the Niemen =

Njemen-Armee Army of the Niemen
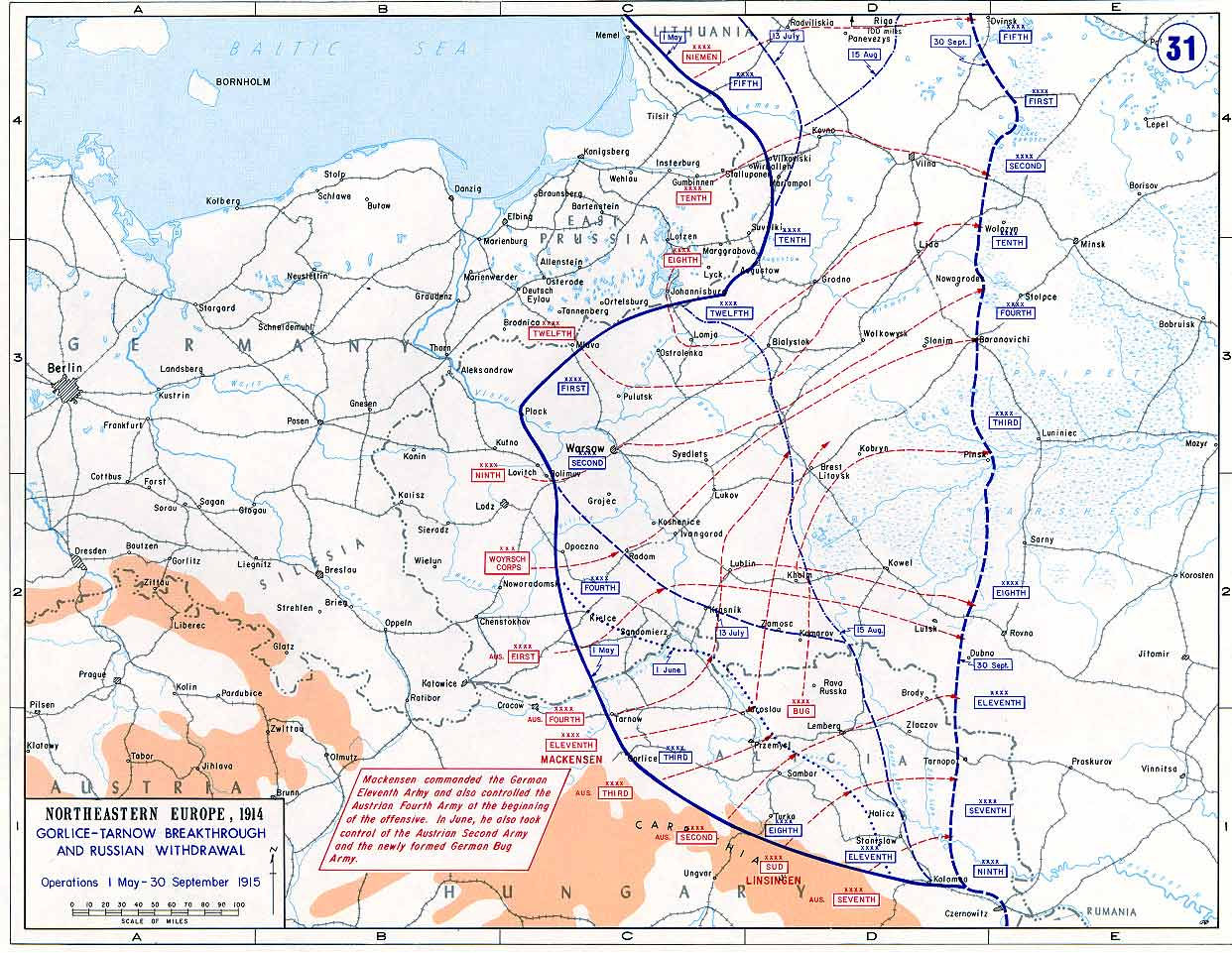
- Eastern Front in the second half of 1915.
- Active: 26 May 1915 – 30 December 1915
- Country: German Empire
- Type: Army
- Engagements: World War I: Eastern Front; German summer offensive 1915: Riga–Šiauliai offensive; First Riga offensive; Vilno-Dvinsk offensive

Insignia
- Abbreviation: A.O.K Njemen

The Army of the Niemen (German: Njemen-Armee) was an army level command of the German Army in World War I.

== Armee-Abteilung Lauenstein ==
The German offensive in Courland was intended to be a diversion while the main effort was made further south by the German 11th Army and Austro-Hungarian 4th Army in the Gorlice–Tarnów Offensive.

Armee-Abteilung Lauenstein (Army Detachment Lauenstein) was formed by upgrading XXXIX Reserve Corps of 10th Army on 22 April 1915. It was named for its commander, Generalleutnant Otto von Lauenstein, who retained simultaneous command of XXXIX Reserve Corps. It was directly under the command of OB East. Due to its success, it was continuously reinforced until it was raised to the status of an army as the Army of the Niemen. Generalleutnant von Lauenstein remained as commander of XXXIX Reserve Corps.

== Army of the Niemen ==
The Army of the Niemen was formed on 26 May 1915 to control the troops in Courland. The former commander of the 8th Army, General der Infanterie Otto von Below, along with his chief of staff, Generalmajor von Böckmann, assumed command. The Army of the Niemen took part in the successful German Riga–Schaulen offensive.

In the meantime, the 8th Army got a deputy commander, General der Artillerie Friedrich von Scholtz, who was simultaneously commander of XX Corps. 8th Army was dissolved on 29 September 1915.

On 30 December 1915 the Army of the Niemen was renamed as the 8th Army with von Below still in command.

== Glossary ==
- Armee-Abteilung or Army Detachment in the sense of "something detached from an Army". It is not under the command of an Army so is in itself a small Army.
- Armee-Gruppe or Army Group in the sense of a group within an Army and under its command, generally formed as a temporary measure for a specific task.
- Heeresgruppe or Army Group in the sense of a number of armies under a single commander.

== See also ==
- XXXIX Reserve Corps
- 8th Army (German Empire)
- Great Retreat (Russian)

== Bibliography ==
- Cron, Hermann (2002). Imperial German Army 1914–18: Organisation, Structure, Orders-of-Battle [first published: 1937]. Helion & Co. ISBN 1-874622-70-1.
- Ellis, John; Cox, Michael (1993). The World War I Databook. Aurum Press Ltd. ISBN 1-85410-766-6.
