= XXXIX Reserve Corps =

XXXIX Reserve Corps XXXIX. Reserve-Korps
- Flag of the Staff of a Generalkommando (1871–1918)
- Active: December 1914 - post November 1918
- Country: German Empire
- Type: Corps
- Size: Approximately 26,000 (on formation)
- Engagements: World War I

Insignia
- Abbreviation: XXXIX RK

The XXXIX Reserve Corps (German: XXXIX. Reserve-Korps / XXXIX RK) was a corps level command of the German Army in World War I.

== Formation ==
XXXIX Reserve Corps was formed in December 1914. It was part of the second wave of new Corps formed in the early stages of World War I consisting of XXXVIII - XXXXI Reserve Corps of 75th - 82nd Reserve Divisions (plus 8th Bavarian Reserve Division). The personnel was predominantly made up of kriegsfreiwillige (wartime volunteers) who did not wait to be called up. It was still in existence at the end of the war.

=== Structure on formation ===
On formation in December 1914, XXXIX Reserve Corps consisted of two divisions. but was weaker than an Active Corps

- the divisions were organised as triangular rather than square divisions with three infantry regiments rather than four, but had a brigade of two field artillery regiments
- Reserve Infantry Regiments consisted of three battalions but lacked a machine gun company
- Reserve Cavalry Detachments were much smaller than the Reserve Cavalry Regiments formed on mobilisation
- Reserve Field Artillery Regiments consisted of two abteilungen (1 gun and 1 howitzer) of three batteries each, but each battery had just 4 guns (rather than 6 of the Active and the Reserve Regiments formed on mobilisation)

In summary, XXXIX Reserve Corps mobilised with 18 infantry battalions, 2 cavalry detachments, 24 field artillery batteries (96 guns), 2 cyclist companies and 2 pioneer companies.

Corps	Division	Brigade	Units
XXXIX Reserve Corps	77th Reserve Division	77th Reserve Infantry Brigade	255th Reserve Infantry Regiment
XXXIX Reserve Corps	77th Reserve Division	77th Reserve Infantry Brigade	256th Reserve Infantry Regiment
XXXIX Reserve Corps	77th Reserve Division	77th Reserve Infantry Brigade	257th Reserve Infantry Regiment
XXXIX Reserve Corps	77th Reserve Division	77th Reserve Field Artillery Brigade	59th Reserve Field Artillery Regiment
XXXIX Reserve Corps	77th Reserve Division	77th Reserve Field Artillery Brigade	60th Reserve Field Artillery Regiment
XXXIX Reserve Corps	77th Reserve Division		77th Reserve Cavalry Detachment
XXXIX Reserve Corps	77th Reserve Division		77th Reserve Cyclist Company
XXXIX Reserve Corps	77th Reserve Division		77th Reserve Pioneer Company
XXXIX Reserve Corps	78th Reserve Division	78th Reserve Infantry Brigade	258th Reserve Infantry Regiment
XXXIX Reserve Corps	78th Reserve Division	78th Reserve Infantry Brigade	259th Reserve Infantry Regiment
XXXIX Reserve Corps	78th Reserve Division	78th Reserve Infantry Brigade	260th Reserve Infantry Regiment
XXXIX Reserve Corps	78th Reserve Division	78th Reserve Field Artillery Brigade	61st Reserve Field Artillery Regiment
XXXIX Reserve Corps	78th Reserve Division	78th Reserve Field Artillery Brigade	62nd Reserve Field Artillery Regiment
XXXIX Reserve Corps	78th Reserve Division		78th Reserve Cavalry Detachment
XXXIX Reserve Corps	78th Reserve Division		78th Reserve Cyclist Company
XXXIX Reserve Corps	78th Reserve Division		78th Reserve Pioneer Company

== Combat chronicle ==
In 1915, the German offensive in Courland was intended to be a diversion while the main effort was made further south by the German 11th Army and Austro-Hungarian 4th Army in the Gorlice–Tarnów Offensive.

Armee-Abteilung Lauenstein (Army Detachment Lauenstein) was formed by upgrading XXXIX Reserve Corps of 10th Army on 22 April 1915. It was named for its commander, Generalleutnant Otto von Lauenstein, who retained simultaneous command of XXXIX Reserve Corps. It was directly under the command of OB East.

Due to its success, it was continuously reinforced until it was raised to the status of an army as the Army of the Niemen on 26 May 1915. Generalleutnant von Lauenstein remained as commander of XXXIX Reserve Corps.

== Commanders ==
XXXIX Reserve Corps had the following commanders during its existence:

From	Rank	Name
24 December 1914	Generalleutnant	Otto von Lauenstein
7 July 1916	Generalleutnant	Hermann von Staabs
3 December 1917	General der Infanterie	Hermann von Staabs
16 March 1918	Generalleutnant	Paul Grünert
23 May 1918	General der Infanterie	Hermann von Staabs

== Glossary ==
- Armee-Abteilung or Army Detachment in the sense of "something detached from an Army". It is not under the command of an Army so is in itself a small Army.
- Armee-Gruppe or Army Group in the sense of a group within an Army and under its command, generally formed as a temporary measure for a specific task.
- Heeresgruppe or Army Group in the sense of a number of armies under a single commander.

== See also ==
- Armee-Abteilung Lauenstein

== Bibliography ==
- Cron, Hermann (2002). Imperial German Army 1914-18: Organisation, Structure, Orders-of-Battle [first published: 1937]. Helion & Co. ISBN 1-874622-70-1.
- Ellis, John; Cox, Michael (1993). The World War I Databook. Aurum Press Ltd. ISBN 1-85410-766-6.
- Busche, Hartwig (1998). Formationsgeschichte der Deutschen Infanterie im Ersten Weltkrieg (1914 bis 1918) (in German). Institut für Preußische Historiographie.
- Histories of Two Hundred and Fifty-One Divisions of the German Army which Participated in the War (1914-1918), compiled from records of Intelligence section of the General Staff, American Expeditionary Forces, at General Headquarters, Chaumont, France 1919. The London Stamp Exchange Ltd. 1989 [1920]. ISBN 0-948130-87-3.
- The German Forces in the Field; 7th Revision, 11th November 1918; Compiled by the General Staff, War Office. Imperial War Museum, London and the Battery Press. 1995 [1918]. ISBN 978-1-870423-95-3.
