= Aleksandr Gerngross =

Imperial Russian Army general (1851–1925)

Baron Alexandr Alekseyevich Gerngross
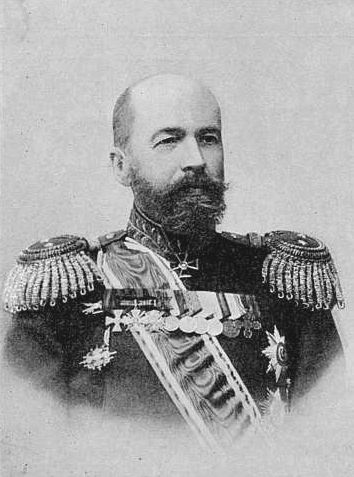
- General Alexandr Gerngross
- Born: 4 August 1851; Smolensk, Russian Empire
- Died: 17 March 1925 (aged 73); Leningrad, Soviet Union
- Military career
- Allegiance: Russian Empire
- Branch: Russian Imperial Army
- Service years: 1861–1916
- Rank: Infantry General
- Conflicts: Russo-Turkish War; Boxer Rebellion; Russo-Japanese War; World War I

Baron Alexandr Alekseyevich Gerngross (Russian: Алекса́ндр Алексе́евич Ге́рнгросс) (4 August 1851 – 17 March 1925) was a general of Dutch descent who served in the Imperial Russian Army during the late 19th and early 20th centuries.

== Biography ==
Gerngross was from a Baltic German noble family of Dutch origin. He entered military service in 1868, and graduated from the Riga School of Infantry. Commissioned as an ensign in 1871, he served with the 63rd Infantry Regiment. He was promoted to second lieutenant in 1873 and to lieutenant in 1875. Serving with distinction during the Russo-Turkish War (1877–1878) he received a field commission as brevet captain, which was formally confirmed in 1879. He rose to lieutenant colonel in 1887.

He served in Russian Turkestan from 1891 to 1897, during which time he was responsible for land surveys for the Trans-Caspian Railway. He was promoted to colonel in 1894, and became commander of the Transcaspian Infantry Battalion to August 1897. Gergross then commanded the border guards units of the Russian Ministry of Finance through 1901. In 1900, he was stationed in Harbin, and played an important role in the defense of Harbin during the Russian suppression of the Boxer Rebellion in 1900–1901. He was awarded the Order of St. George (4th class) for heroism during this campaign.

From 1902, Gerngross was commander of the 1st Siberian Infantry Brigade, which was subsequently active in combat during the Russo-Japanese War of 1904–1905. He was promoted to lieutenant general in 1904. During the Battle of Te-li-Ssu, his division came under a strong artillery attack from the Imperial Japanese Army, and suffered heavy losses. Although the promised reinforcements never arrived, he personally led two regiments in a successful counterattack on Japanese positions. He was wounded in the battle, and was subsequently awarded the Gold Sword for Bravery. He was also at the Battle of Liaoyang.

At the Battle of Shaho, Gerngross commanded the reserve forces, which he used to recapture positions from the Japanese south of the Sha River before being ordered to withdraw.

During the Battle of Sandepu, Gerngross led a detachment consisting of the 2nd, 3rd, 35th and 36th Infantry Regiments in a successful night attack, which split the Japanese 3rd Division and succeeded in securing a foothold within the fortified village of Sandepu. However, his action was part of the unauthorized offensive and he was again obliged to withdraw, sustaining heavy losses. For this action, he was relieved of his command by General Georgii Stackelberg.

During the Battle of Mukden, Gerngross (who had just been reinstated as commander) and General Konstantin Tserpitsky, despite a lack of reinforcements, led a counterattack, which temporarily halted the advance of the Japanese Third Army.

After the end of the War, Gerngross was made commander of the 1st Siberian Army Corps. He held this position from 23 May 1905 to 7 June 1910. He was subsequently promoted to the rank of infantry general, and commander of the 24th Army Corps until 20 January 1913.

Made a member of the Military Council on 20 November 1913, he then commanded the 26th Army Corps in World War I, from 15 August 1914 to 28 December 1916. He went into retirement after the Russian Revolution, and died of a heart attack in Leningrad in 1925.

== Awards ==
- Order of St. Anne 3rd degree with swords and bow, 1877
- Order of St. Stanislaus 2nd degree with swords, 1878
- Order of St Vladimir 4th degree with swords and bow, 1879.
- Order of St. Anne 2nd degree with swords 1879
- Order of St. George, 4th class, 1900
- Order of St. Stanislaus 1st degree with swords, 1901
- Order of St Vladimir 2nd degree with swords, 1905.
- Order of St. Anne 1st degree with swords 1905.
- Gold Sword for Bravery. 1906
- Order of the White Eagle with swords, 1906
- Order of St. Alexander Nevsky, 1912
