= 77th Reserve Division =

77th Reserve Division (77. Reserve-Division)
- Active: 1914-1918
- Country: Germany
- Branch: Army
- Type: Infantry
- Size: Approx. 12,500
- Engagements: World War I: Second Battle of the Masurian Lakes, Gorlice-Tarnów Offensive, Battle of Riga, German spring offensive, First Battle of the Somme (1918), Battle of Saint-Mihiel

The 77th Reserve Division (77. Reserve-Division) was a unit of the Imperial German Army in World War I. The division was formed at the end of December 1914 and organized over the next month, arriving in the line in early February 1915. It was part of the second large wave of new divisions formed at the outset of World War I, which were numbered the 75th through 82nd Reserve Divisions. The division was initially part of XXXIX Reserve Corps. The division was disbanded in September 1918 and its assets were distributed to other units. When originally formed, the division had two reserve infantry regiments from the Province of Westphalia (255th and 256th) and one from the Rhine Province (257th). The two Westphalian regiments were replaced late in the war by the 332nd Infantry Regiment, a garrison regiment from Posen with two Rhineland battalions and one Posen battalion (with a number of Poles as well as Germans), and the 419th Infantry Regiment, a thoroughly mixed unit made of companies taken from different regiments.

== Combat chronicle ==
The 77th Reserve Division initially fought on the Eastern Front, seeing its first action in the Second Battle of the Masurian Lakes. It later fought in the Gorlice-Tarnów Offensive, including in the Siege of Kaunas and the battles of the Nemunas, Grodno, and Vilnius. The division remained in the Courland region near Daugavpils throughout 1916 and until September 1, 1917. It then fought in the Battle of Riga and afterwards remained in positional warfare north of the Daugava River. After the armistice on the Eastern Front, the division briefly served in Livonia and Estonia, and then was transferred to the Western Front. It fought in the 1918 German spring offensive, seeing action in the First Battle of the Somme (1918), also called the Second Battle of the Somme (to distinguish it from the 1916 battle). After more fighting in the Somme region, the division went to the Woëvre region, between the Meuse and Moselle Rivers. The division was hit hard by the American attack on St. Mihiel, losing a large number of prisoners, and was dissolved shortly thereafter, with the remnants being distributed to other units. Allied intelligence rated the division as third class.

== Order of battle on formation ==
The 77th Reserve Division, like the other divisions of its wave and unlike earlier German divisions, was organized from the outset as a triangular division. The order of battle of the division on December 29, 1914, was as follows:

- 77.Reserve-Infanterie-Brigade
  - Reserve-Infanterie-Regiment Nr. 255
  - Reserve-Infanterie-Regiment Nr. 256
  - Reserve-Infanterie-Regiment Nr. 257
  - Reserve-Radfahrer-Kompanie Nr. 77
- Reserve-Kavallerie-Abteilung Nr. 77
- 77.Reserve-Feldartillerie-Brigade
  - Reserve-Feldartillerie-Regiment Nr. 59
  - Reserve-Feldartillerie-Regiment Nr. 60
- Reserve-Pionier-Kompanie Nr. 78
- Reserve-Pionier-Kompanie Nr. 79

== Order of battle on February 10, 1918 ==
The most significant wartime structural change in the divisions of this wave was the reduction from two field artillery regiments to one. Over the course of the war, other changes took place, including the formation of artillery and signals commands and the enlargement of combat engineer support to a full pioneer battalion. The order of battle on February 10, 1918, was as follows:

- 77.Reserve-Infanterie-Brigade
  - Reserve-Infanterie-Regiment Nr. 257
  - Infanterie-Regiment Nr. 332
  - Infanterie-Regiment Nr. 419
  - Reserve-Radfahrer-Abteilung Nr. 77
- 1.Eskadron/Husaren-Regiment Kaiser Franz Josef von Österreich, König von Ungarn (Schleswig-Holsteinisches) Nr. 16
- Artillerie-Kommandeur 77
  - Reserve-Feldartillerie-Regiment Nr. 59
  - III.Bataillon/1. Westpreußisches Fußartillerie-Regiment Nr. 11 (from April 23, 1918)
- Pionier-Bataillon Nr. 403
  - 1.Kompanie/Pionier-Bataillon Fürst Radziwill (Ostpreußisches) Nr. 1
  - 1.Landwehr-Pionier-Kompanie/VII. Armeekorps
  - Minenwerfer-Kompanie Nr. 277
- Divisions-Nachrichten-Kommandeur 477
