= 26th Army Corps (Russian Empire) =

- Country: Russian Empire
- Allegiance: Imperial Russian Army
- Engagements: First World War; Eastern Front; Battle of Smorgon

The 26th Army Corps was an Army corps in the Imperial Russian Army during the First World War.

== Gas attack during the Battle of Smorgon ==
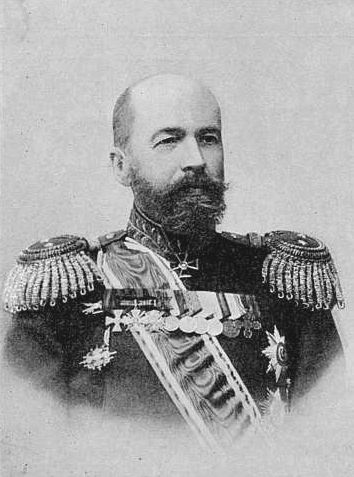
General of the Infantry Aleksandr Gerngross, commander of the 26th Army Corps at the Battle of Smorgon

In 1916 in modern-day Belarus, during the Battle of Smorgon on the Eastern Front of the First World War, soldiers of the 26th Army Corps occupied positions near Smorgon. The 64th, 65th, and 84th Infantry Divisions of the 26th Army Corps took up positions in the area from the village of Perevozy on the Vilija River to the village of Tsari on the Belaya River. The terrain in the Smorgon area was relatively flat and with good visibility, while the ground between the German trenches and the Russian trenches sloped gently down from the former's to the latter's. This was an ideal scenario for chemical weapons to be employed to good effect by the Germans, who made use of their opportunity to do so on 19 June 1916. The distance between the German and Russian trenches ranged between 100 metres and 500 metres. As early as a fortnight before the German attack, Russian aerial reconnaissance observed German troops on the ground manoeuvring heavy bulky objects from trucks and carrying them into their trenches — these were gas cylinders containing deadly chemical agents to be released into the wind and carried down the gently sloping terrain and into the Russian trenches. Damningly, a Russian artillery observer reported that after one of their shells had struck a German trench, a brown cloud subsequently spread across the ground, with several German soldiers collapsing while trying to run away towards the German rear. These events convinced the Russian command that the Germans were planning a gas attack and the 26th Army Corps was hastily and intensively supplied with anti-gas countermeasures like gas masks supplemented by the construction of bonfires, which were used at the time in front of trench positions in an attempt to create a smoke barrier denser than the gas to prevent it from passing, among other countermeasures.

On 19 June 1916, at 03:15 in the early morning, whilst a light 2 mph wind blew from west to east, the German attack commenced with an intense artillery barrage of chemical shells fired at the Russian support and reserve line trenches, as well as artillery batteries, communication trenches, and the Russian rear. Minutes later, near the Gervyatka River, Smorgon Railway Station, and the villages of Lychniki and Narota, the Germans opened their gas cylinders which hissed loudly as they released the first wave of gas which appeared bluish in colour. At that instant, Russian signallers sounded the gas alarm and soldiers donned their gas masks and attempted to light their pre-built fires in front of their trenches, but this was to no avail as the fires had been dampened by rain and would not burn. The German soldiers followed closely behind the first gas cloud carrying rifles, grenades, and crude trench raiding clubs to finish off those who had been incapacitated by the gas. Upon reaching the Russian wire, the Germans became held up and could advance no further. They soon came under heavy fire from the Russians and they retreated to their frontline trenches. Assuming the attack had been repelled and was now over, many Russian soldiers removed their gas masks, which were hard to breathe through and many of which had dried out and required rehydration using their barrels of sodium bicarbonate water erected in their trenches in anticipation of the gas attack, though many did not bother since they believe the attack had now come and gone. The evacuation towards the rear of those who had been gassed also began.

At that moment, a second and larger wave of gas was released by the Germans, this time denser and milky-blue in colour. The resulting gas cloud reached a height of 8 metres and was spread over a 5 kilometre front. Behind this second gas wave was a rolling smoke screen, and behind that, 4 waves of German infantry advanced to the attack. Despite this attack being stronger than the first, it too was repelled by concentrated Russian rifle, artillery, and especially machine gun fire. The gas attack had lasted for around 90 minutes and had penetrated as deep as 12 kilometres into the Russian's defences and rear, inflicting heavy losses on the 26th Army Corps.

45 officers (of whom 5 died), and 2,505 enlisted soldiers (of whom 429 died), were gassed in three divisions of the 26th Army Corps during the attack, with the 254th Nikolaevsky Infantry Regiment suffering the worst of any unit, reporting 1,606 men gassed (of whom 412, or over 25% of those gassed, died). Many artillery horses also died as a result of gas exposure. The catastrophic losses from gas alone were attributed to the actions of the soldiers themselves rather than an issue with their commanders or intelligence. The inability to light the fires in front of the Russian trenches due their damp condition, heavy fire from the advancing Germans, and the lack of time to do so played a role. While gas masks had been issued in advance of the attack and regular gas alarm drills were carried out, many Russian soldiers were ignorant to the possibility of such a large scale gas attack occurring and deemed it impossible, despite warnings from their superiors. Soldiers did not keep their gas masks on them but instead left them laying around nearby. Many did not take account of where they had left their gas masks, and those who had left them hanging on the walls of the trench found it hard to reach them in time as a result of the panic and crush that ensued once the gas alarm was raised.

== Part of ==
- 1st Army: From 22 September 1914
- 8th Army: 10 October 1914 – 1 August 1916
- Russian Special Army: 1 September 1916 – 11 September 1916
- 9th Army: 15 September 1916 – 8 November 1917

== Commanders ==
- General of the Infantry Aleksandr Gerngross: 15 August 1914 – 28 December 1916
- Yevgeny Miller: 28 December 1916 – 1917
