= Siege of Kaunas (1915) =

World War I battle

- Part of the Eastern Front during World War I
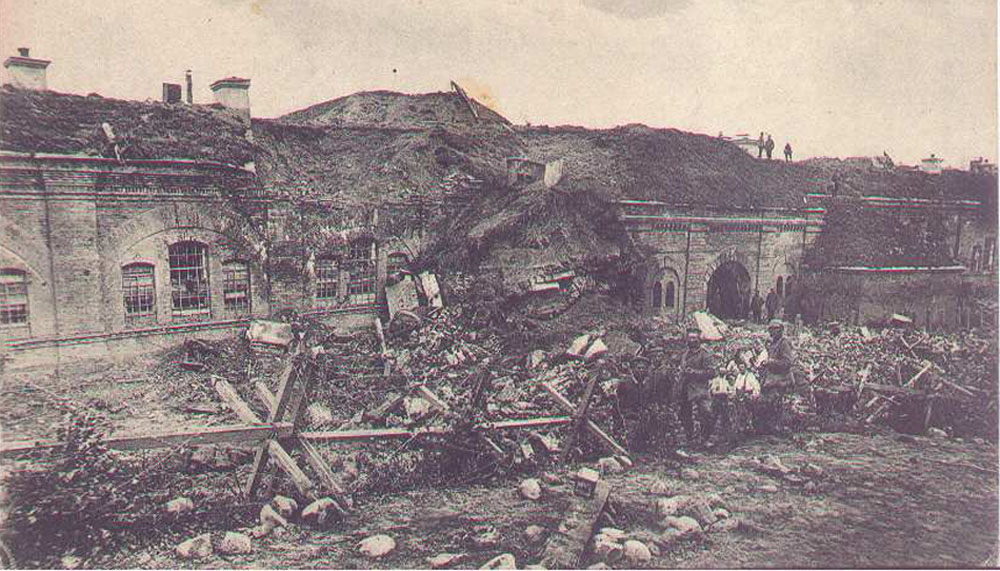
- 2nd Fort after German bombardment
Date	12 August – 18 August [O.S. 30 July–5 August] 1915
Location	Kaunas, Russian Empire (now Lithuania)
Result	German victory

Belligerents
German Empire	Russian Empire

Commanders and leaders
(German Empire) Karl Litzmann	Vladimir Grigoriev

Strength
Unknown; 1,360 guns	66,000; 1,370 guns

Casualties and losses
Unknown	~45,000 total (Note: 20,000 prisoners,7,000-8,000 killed and 17,000 wounded); 1,300 guns (of which 350 were heavy), 100 machine guns, 20,000 rifles, 810,000 shells.

The siege of Kaunas took place from 12 August to 18 August 1915 and with a quick German victory against Russia.

The Imperial German Army launched the Riga–Šiauliai offensive in summer 1915, quickly advancing through Lithuania towards Kaunas, which the Germans reached in July. The Kaunas Fortress garrison had 66,629 men with 1,370 guns, commanded by Vladimir Grigoriev (Russian: Владимир Григорьев). The attacking Germans had four divisions under the command of Karl Litzmann.

== Battle ==
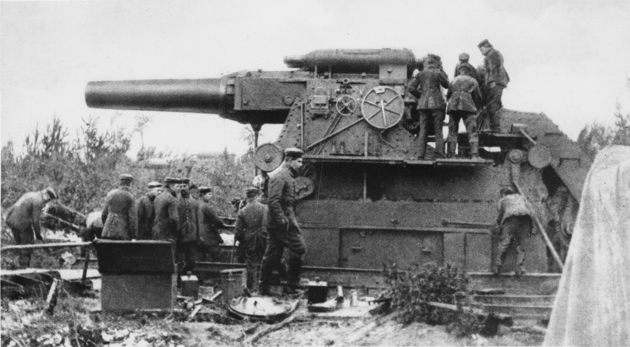
The German Gamma-Gerät gun. German artillery played the key role in the offensive.

To support this attack, the Germans constructed a railroad to transport their 42-centimetre (17 in) Gamma-Gerät howitzer. The howitzer's shell weighed about 1 ton with a range of 14 km (8.7 mi). Several days into the siege more guns of various calibers were deployed.

The German army concentrated its attack on the 1st, 2nd and 3rd Forts, which were the oldest structures of the Kaunas Fortress. The army did not surround the entire fortress, and its defense was able to regroup and resupply. On August 8, the Germans intensified their bombardment, but the fortress garrison withstood several attempts to breach the defensive perimeter. Several days afterward, the bombardment of the fortress reached its peak; its defenders sustained heavy casualty rates of 50% to 75%. On August 14 alone, over 1,000 defending troops were killed, but the Germans were unable to completely overcome the fortress' defenses. However, on the next day, Gamma-Gerät shells destroyed the 1st Fort and the Germans transferred their attentions to the 2nd Fort. The fight was now within the confines of the greater fortress complex.

The commander of the Russian 10th Army, Evgeny Radkevich, at noon on August 16, asked Mikhail Alekseyev: how should one regard the Kaunas fortress transferred to his subordination: whether to allow it to be completely surrounded by the Germans, whether to defend the northern forts, despite the loss of the fortifications of the forts of the First Department, or start evacuating the garrison, weapons and military supplies, as this must be done in a timely manner.

On the morning of August 17, Alekseyev allowed the use of his reserve for the defense of Kaunas - the 4th Finnish Rifle and 65th Infantry Divisions. Radkevich ordered the 3rd Siberian Corps to immediately attack the Germans. In the night battle, the German units that penetrated the forts were driven out, but to the north of the fortress, the detachment of Major General N. Yanovsky was driven back by the German 4th Cavalry Division. From 11:00 Litzmann began shelling the forts of the 1st Defense Department with 208 guns, including 80 heavy and 10 super-heavy howitzers and mortars; fire was corrected from airplanes and balloons. By 12:00, almost all the artillery of the Kaunas forts was put out of action, and the infantry of the German XXXX Reserve Corps went on the attack, broke through between 2nd and 3rd Forts, and captured 1st Fort by 14:00. By 18:00, all the forts of the 1st division were captured; in the northern section, the central fence of the fortress was broken through. Bridges across the Neman were occupied by hundreds of Cossacks and prepared for the explosion. 4,000 prisoners and 52 guns were captured by the German 115th Infantry, 76th and 79th Reserve Divisions.

The bombardment from siege weapons affected the defenses of Kaunas. In the First Department of the fortress, losses reached 75% of the composition (164 officers and 11,968 soldiers), batteries of heavy guns were broken, and anti-assault guns were suppressed. The problem of the defenders was the lack of ammunition: they were armed with Japanese rifles, for which there were no cartridges in Kaunas. Grigoriev appealed in vain to the command of the 10th Army, and even on July 31 he decided to send a complaint to the front headquarters:

Large losses and fatigue of people force people to ask for help, requests for which the 10th Army is silent or is limited by General Popov to incomprehensible polemics ... To replace the melted units, I need 12 whole battalions, at least for the time of putting the garrison units in order.

However, the front headquarters forwarded the complaint to the headquarters of the 10th Army.

By the night of August 17, the garrison of the 1st division completely left the Neman, parts of the Second Defense Department left the fortifications under the threat of encirclement. The commandant of the fortress V. Grigoriev was ordered to "take out everything that is possible, lingering on the remaining forts." At around 01:00, the headquarters of the 10th Army, unable to contact Grigoriev, transferred command of the garrison to the head of the 124th Infantry Division, Infantry General N. Lopushansky, who defended the 4th department of the fortress. It turned out that fort V was still being defended, and fort IV was not occupied by anyone. Bridges across the Neman were blown up.

At 4:00 on August 17, Grigoriev telegraphed to the army headquarters that the garrison had left the fortress and was demoralized. Radkevich reported this to the Commander-in-Chief of the armies of the Northwestern Front Mikhail Alekseyev at 9:00:

The garrison abandoned Kaunas and is running in complete disarray. The commandant was found at about 7 AM in the morning near Rumšiškės... The remnants of the garrison are a disorderly crowd, and according to the commandant, their moral state excludes the possibility of not only going on the offensive, but even holding any position.

Litzmann, in turn, ordered the bombardment of the city center of Kaunas, the citadel and the station, the forts in the northern sector of defense, against which the 3rd Reserve Division and B. von Ezebek's brigade should be sent to attack. Until the evening, the Germans captured the forts of the northern part of the fortress, crossing the 76th and 79th Reserve Divisions across the Neman, the 115th Infantry Division captured the 4th Fort. From 18:30, the Russian 10th Army began to withdraw. The garrison of Kaunas held Rumšiškės and Žiežmariai, the detachment of Lieutenant General Vladimir Alftan (65th Infantry Division and militia) continued to defend the 5th Fort. Radkevich still hoped to return Kaunas and ordered the corps of V. Tofimov and N. Lopushansky to push back the Germans beyond the Neman River, to organize the evacuation of the fortress. The task of recapturing the 3rd and 4th defense departments from the Germans and then defending them "to the last extreme" after midnight on August 18 was also confirmed by Alekseyev.

However, overnight in the Kaunas area, under the German onslaught, the 40th and 54th Don Cossack regiments retreated, N. Lopushansky's detachment was also thrown back. In the evening, the Germans captured the last remaining 5th Fort and completely occupied Kaunas. The XXXX Reserve Corps captured up to 20,000 prisoners, 1,300 guns (of which 350 were heavy), 100 machine guns, 20,000 rifles, 810,000 shells.

== Outcome ==
Grigoriev was arrested by Russian authorities, tried, and sentenced to fifteen years in prison for failure to properly perform his duties. He also suffered the revocation of all his awards, military degrees, and honors. The Germans used materials from the fortress elsewhere during their war against Russia.

Researchers have identified factors contributing to the relatively rapid fall of the fortress. It had not been completely renovated; its defenders were inexperienced; the crew had been frequently rotated, and had not been able to familiarize themselves with the surrounding area and with the fortress. Although most of their experience lay in the defense of the fortress' interior, they were dispatched to fight on open ground. When the combat moved outside the fortress, communication lines were disrupted by the German bombardment, and the fortress defense was unable to restore complete communication with the command center or with other forts. The absence of external support was a crucial factor in its fall.

== See also ==
- Riga–Schaulen offensive

== Bibliography ==
=== Lithuanian-language sources ===
- Pociūnas, Arvydas (2008). Kauno tvirtovės gynyba 1915 metais (PDF) (in Lithuanian). Vilnius: Generolo Jono Žemaičio Lietuvos karo akademija. p. 186. ISBN 978-9955-423-64-5.
- Kviklys, Bronius (1991). Mūsų Lietuva (in Lithuanian). Vol. II. Vilnius: Mintis. ISBN 978-9955-638-97-1.
- Orlov, Vladimir (2007). Kauno tvirtovės istorija (in Lithuanian). Kaunas: Arx Baltica. p. 160. ISBN 978-9955-638-97-1.

=== Russian-language sources ===
- Oleynikov, Alexei (2016). Россия-щит Антанты [Russia-Shield of Entente]. Foreword by Nikolai Starikov. St.Petersburg: Piter. ISBN 978-5-496-01795-4.
- Oleynikov, Alexei (2024). Великое отступление и стабилизация восточного фронта [The Great Retreat and stabilization of the Eastern Front]. Moscow: Вече. ISBN 978-5-4484-4482-1.

- Gilbert, Martin (2023). The First World War: A complete History. Moscow: Квадрига. ISBN 978-5-389-08465-0.
