= XXXX Reserve Corps =

World War I German command

XXXX Reserve Corps XXXX. Reserve-Korps
- Flag of the Staff of a Generalkommando (1871–1918)
- Active: December 1914 - posts November 1918
- Country: German Empire
- Type: Corps
- Size: Approximately 26,000 (on formation)
- Engagements: World War I

The XXXX Reserve Corps (German: XXXX. Reserve-Korps / XXXX RK) was a corps level command of the German Army in World War I.

== Formation ==
XXXX Reserve Corps was formed in December 1914. It was part of the second wave of new Corps formed in the early stages of World War I consisting of XXXVIII - XXXXI Reserve Corps of 75th - 82nd Reserve Divisions (plus 8th Bavarian Reserve Division). The personnel was predominantly made up of kriegsfreiwillige (wartime volunteers) who did not wait to be called up. It was still in existence at the end of the war in the 6th Army, Heeresgruppe Kronprinz Rupprecht on the Western Front.

=== Structure on formation ===
On formation in December 1914, XXXX Reserve Corps consisted of two divisions. but was weaker than an Active Corps

- the divisions were organised as triangular rather than square divisions with three infantry regiments rather than four, but had a brigade of two field artillery regiments
- Reserve Infantry Regiments consisted of three battalions but lacked a machine gun company
- Reserve Cavalry Detachments were much smaller than the Reserve Cavalry Regiments formed on mobilisation
- Reserve Field Artillery Regiments consisted of two abteilungen (1 gun and 1 howitzer) of three batteries each, but each battery had just 4 guns (rather than 6 of the Active and the Reserve Regiments formed on mobilisation)

In summary, XXXX Reserve Corps mobilised with 18 infantry battalions, 2 cavalry detachments, 24 field artillery batteries (96 guns), 2 cyclist companies and 2 pioneer companies.

Corps	Division	Brigade	Units
XXXX Reserve Corps	79th Reserve Division	79th Reserve Infantry Brigade	261st Reserve Infantry Regiment
XXXX Reserve Corps	79th Reserve Division	79th Reserve Infantry Brigade	262nd Reserve Infantry Regiment
XXXX Reserve Corps	79th Reserve Division	79th Reserve Infantry Brigade	263rd Reserve Infantry Regiment
XXXX Reserve Corps	79th Reserve Division	79th Reserve Field Artillery Brigade	63rd Reserve Field Artillery Regiment
XXXX Reserve Corps	79th Reserve Division	79th Reserve Field Artillery Brigade	64th Reserve Field Artillery Regiment
XXXX Reserve Corps	79th Reserve Division		79th Reserve Cavalry Detachment
XXXX Reserve Corps	79th Reserve Division		79th Reserve Cyclist Company
XXXX Reserve Corps	79th Reserve Division		79th Reserve Pioneer Company
XXXX Reserve Corps	80th Reserve Division	80th Reserve Infantry Brigade	264th Reserve Infantry Regiment
XXXX Reserve Corps	80th Reserve Division	80th Reserve Infantry Brigade	265th Reserve Infantry Regiment
XXXX Reserve Corps	80th Reserve Division	80th Reserve Infantry Brigade	266th Reserve Infantry Regiment
XXXX Reserve Corps	80th Reserve Division	80th Reserve Field Artillery Brigade	65th Reserve Field Artillery Regiment
XXXX Reserve Corps	80th Reserve Division	80th Reserve Field Artillery Brigade	66th Reserve Field Artillery Regiment
XXXX Reserve Corps	80th Reserve Division		80th Reserve Cavalry Detachment
XXXX Reserve Corps	80th Reserve Division		80th Reserve Cyclist Company
XXXX Reserve Corps	80th Reserve Division		80th Reserve Pioneer Company

== Commanders ==
XXXX Reserve Corps had the following commanders during its existence:

From	Rank	Name
24 December 1914	General der Infanterie	Karl Litzmann
6 August 1918	Generalleutnant	Paul Grünert

== See also ==
- German Army order of battle, Western Front (1918)

== Bibliography ==
- Cron, Hermann (2002). Imperial German Army 1914-18: Organisation, Structure, Orders-of-Battle [first published: 1937]. Helion & Co. ISBN 1-874622-70-1.
- Ellis, John; Cox, Michael (1993). The World War I Databook. Aurum Press Ltd. ISBN 1-85410-766-6.
- Busche, Hartwig (1998). Formationsgeschichte der Deutschen Infanterie im Ersten Weltkrieg (1914 bis 1918) (in German). Institut für Preußische Historiographie.
- Histories of Two Hundred and Fifty-One Divisions of the German Army which Participated in the War (1914-1918), compiled from records of Intelligence section of the General Staff, American Expeditionary Forces, at General Headquarters, Chaumont, France 1919. The London Stamp Exchange Ltd. 1989 [1920]. ISBN 0-948130-87-3.
- The German Forces in the Field; 7th Revision, 11th November 1918; Compiled by the General Staff, War Office. Imperial War Museum, London and the Battery Press. 1995 [1918]. ISBN 978-1-870423-95-3.
