= Vecmēmele Manor =

Manor house in Latvia

- Selonia, Latvia
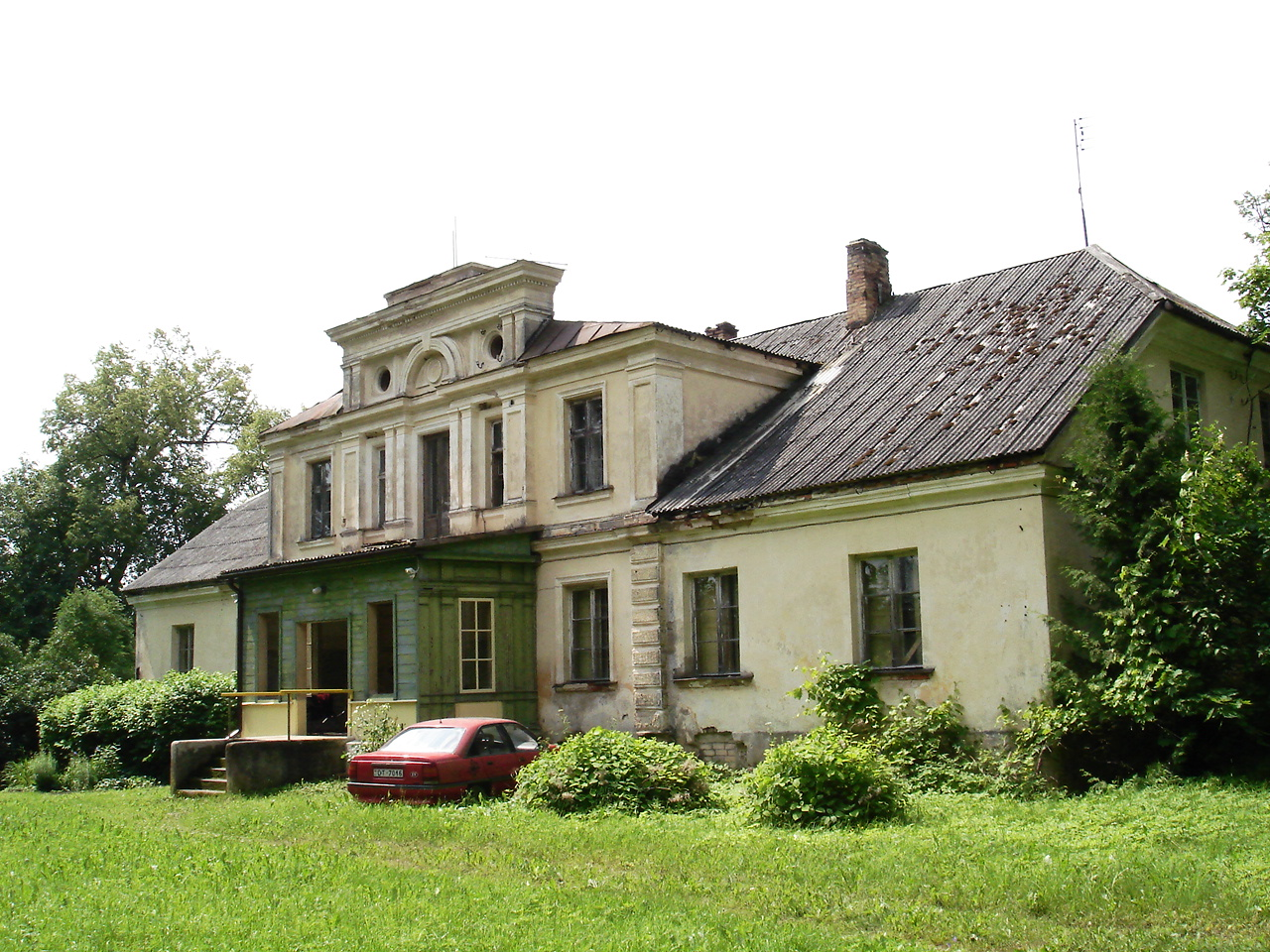

Site information
- Type: Manor

Location
- Coordinates: 56°16′35″N 25°01′30″E

Site history
- Built: About 1830

Vecmēmele Manor (Latvian: Vecmēmeles muiža, German: Alt-Memelhof, in the past also German: Pranke) is a manor house in Mazzalve Parish, Aizkraukle Municipality in the Selonia region of Latvia.

== History ==
Vecmēmele Manor was established in 1516, when Wolter von Plettenberg gave the land there to the Johann Stihhorst ( Stichhorst ), whose family hold this estate until 1675. The estate later belonged to the Zõge von Manteuffel-Cege, the von Bister family, the Dranenfeldt and, before the Latvia land reform of 1920, to the von Haaren. Mentioned as Vecmeme Manor in 1704, also known as Pranke Manor, and in 1753 as Memeele Manor. In 1870, when the manors were owned by Bistrami, a Lithuanian pastor, musician and folklorist Theodor Brazis was born at Vecmeme Manor.

Built in the second quarter of the 19th century, the manor was later rebuilt in Italian Neo-Renaissance style with modern building decoration using arches, pilasters, cornices and decorative medallions. The interior decoration is dominated by simplified forms, such as wall and ceiling finishes, and paintings used in fake wooden structures. It is currently privately owned.

The manor complex also included a number of outbuildings - the houses of the landlords and servants, two cellars and a barn. The manor house, servant's lower house, carpenter's house, two cellars and a granary have survived to a present day. The threshing floor barns and stables are in ruins.

The park is decorated with linden trees alleys and horse chestnut alleys.

== See also ==
- List of palaces and manor houses in Latvia
