= 79th Reserve Division =

79th Reserve Division (79. Reserve-Division)
- Active: 1914-1919
- Country: Germany
- Branch: Army
- Type: Infantry
- Size: Approx. 12,500
- Engagements: World War I: Second Battle of the Masurian Lakes, Battle of Arras (1917), Passchendaele, Battle of Cambrai (1917), German spring offensive, First Battle of the Somme (1918), Second Battle of the Marne

The 79th Reserve Division (79. Reserve-Division) was a unit of the Imperial German Army in World War I. The division was formed at the end of December 1914 and organized over the next month, arriving in the line in early February 1915. It was part of the second large wave of new divisions formed at the outset of World War I, which were numbered the 75th to 82nd Reserve Divisions.

The division was initially part of XXXX Reserve Corps. The division was disbanded in 1919 during the demobilization of the German Army after World War I. Two regiments of the division were raised through Prussian Guard recruit depots throughout the kingdom, while the third was raised in Prussian Saxony.

== Combat chronicle ==
The 79th Reserve Division initially fought on the Eastern Front, seeing its first action in the Second Battle of the Masurian Lakes. In 1915, it fought in the siege of Kaunas and the battles of Nemunas and Vilnius. From October 1915 to November 1916, the division was engaged in positional warfare, after which it was transferred to the Western Front. It was in reserve and then engaged in positional warfare in Flanders and the Artois until April 1917, when it fought in the Battle of Arras.

Later in 1917, it fought in the Battles of Passchendaele and Cambrai. The division participated in the German 1918 Spring Offensive, fighting in the First Battle of the Somme (1918), also called the Second Battle of the Somme, to distinguish it from the 1916 battle. It saw action in the Second Battle of the Marne and continued fighting against the various Allied offensives until the end of the war. Allied intelligence rated the division as third class.

== Order of battle on formation ==
The 79th Reserve Division, like the other divisions of its wave and unlike earlier German divisions, was organized from the outset as a triangular division. The order of battle of the division on December 29, 1914, was as follows:

- 79.Reserve-Infanterie-Brigade
  - Reserve-Infanterie-Regiment Nr. 261
  - Reserve-Infanterie-Regiment Nr. 262
  - Reserve-Infanterie-Regiment Nr. 263
  - Reserve-Radfahrer-Kompanie Nr. 79
- Reserve-Kavallerie-Abteilung Nr. 79
- 79.Reserve-Feldartillerie-Brigade
  - Reserve-Feldartillerie-Regiment Nr. 63
  - Reserve-Feldartillerie-Regiment Nr. 64
- Reserve-Pionier-Kompanie Nr. 81

== Order of battle on February 23, 1918 ==
The most significant wartime structural change in the divisions of this wave was the reduction from two field artillery regiments to one. Over the war, other changes took place, including the formation of artillery and signals commands and the enlargement of combat engineer support to a full pioneer battalion. The order of battle on February 23, 1918, was as follows:

- 79.Reserve-Infanterie-Brigade
  - Reserve-Infanterie-Regiment Nr. 261
  - Reserve-Infanterie-Regiment Nr. 262
  - Reserve-Infanterie-Regiment Nr. 263
  - Maschinengewehr-Scharfschützen-Abteilung Nr. 12
- 3.Eskadron/Husaren-Regiment Kaiser Franz Josef von Österreich, König von Ungarn (Schleswig-Holsteinisches) Nr. 16
- Artillerie-Kommandeur 79
  - Reserve-Feldartillerie-Regiment Nr. 63
  - II.Bataillon/Fußartillerie-Regiment Nr. 20
- Pionier-Bataillon Nr. 379
  - Reserve-Pionier-Kompanie Nr. 81
  - 1.Ersatz-Kompanie/Pionier-Bataillon Nr. 24
  - Minenwerfer-Kompanie Nr. 279
- Divisions-Nachrichten-Kommandeur 479
