= 115th Infantry Division (German Empire) =

115th Infantry Division (115. Infanterie-Division)
- Active: 1915–19
- Country: German Empire
- Branch: Army
- Type: Infantry
- Size: Approx. 12,500
- Engagements: World War I: Second Battle of Artois; Gorlice–Tarnów Offensive; Romanian Campaign; Meuse-Argonne Offensive

The 115th Infantry Division (115. Infanterie-Division) was a formation of the Imperial German Army in World War I. The division was formed on 2 April 1915, and organized over the next several weeks. It was part of a wave of new infantry divisions formed in the spring of 1915. The division was disbanded in 1919 during the demobilization of the German Army after World War I.

The division was formed primarily from the excess infantry regiments of regular infantry divisions which were being triangularized. The division's 229th Infantry Brigade staff was formerly the staff of the 82nd Infantry Brigade of the 39th Infantry Division, which came to the new division along with the 171st Infantry Regiment. The 40th Reserve Infantry Regiment was formerly part of the 28th Reserve Division. The 136th Infantry Regiment came from the 30th Infantry Division. The 40th Reserve Infantry Regiment was raised in the Grand Duchy of Baden. The 136th Infantry and the 171st Infantry were Alsace-Lorraine regiments, but mainly drew from the Rhineland. Cavalry support came in the form of Baden dragoons. The artillery and combat engineer units were newly formed.

== Combat chronicle ==
The 115th Infantry Division initially fought on the Western Front in World War I, entering the line in the Artois in April 1915, fighting in the Second Battle of Artois, and then moving to the Aisne region. On 30 July the division left the line and was transported to the Eastern Front, arriving in August and entering the line in the siege of Kaunas. It participated in the Gorlice-Tarnów Offensive and was in the line until November 1916, when it went to the Romanian Front. It fought on the Romanian front into late 1917, and then remained in Romania for several months after the armistice on that front. In April 1918, the division was transported back to the Western Front. After a period in reserve and on the Belgian/Dutch border, it entered combat in June 1916 in the Champagne region. It remained in the Champagne, Verdun and Woëvre regions and then fought against the Meuse-Argonne Offensive. Allied intelligence rated the division as third class.

== Order of battle on formation ==
The 115th Infantry Division was formed as a triangular division. The order of battle of the division on 3 April 1915 was as follows:

- 229. Infanterie-Brigade
  - Reserve-Infanterie-Regiment Nr. 40
  - 4. Lothringisches Infanterie-Regiment Nr. 136
  - 2. Ober-Elsässiches Infanterie-Regiment Nr. 171
- 1.Eskadron/3. Badisches Dragoner-Regiment Prinz Karl Nr. 22
- 2.Eskadron/3. Badisches Dragoner-Regiment Prinz Karl Nr. 22
- Feldartillerie-Regiment Nr. 229
- Fußartillerie-Batterie Nr. 115
- Pionier-Kompanie Nr. 229

== Late-war order of battle ==
The division underwent relatively few organizational changes over the course of the war. Cavalry was reduced, artillery and signals commands were formed, and combat engineer support was expanded to a full pioneer battalion. The order of battle on 1 February 1918 was as follows:

- 229. Infanterie-Brigade
  - Reserve-Infanterie-Regiment Nr. 40
  - 4. Lothringisches Infanterie-Regiment Nr. 136
  - 2. Ober-Elsässiches Infanterie-Regiment Nr. 171
- 2.Eskadron/3. Badisches Dragoner-Regiment Prinz Karl Nr. 22
- Artillerie-Kommandeur 115
  - Feldartillerie-Regiment Nr. 229
  - Fußartillerie-Bataillon Nr. 94 (from 1 May 1918)
- Pionier-Bataillon Nr. 43
  - 3. Reserve-Kompanie/Pionier-Bataillon Nr. 33
  - Pionier-Kompanie Nr. 229
  - Minenwerfer-Kompanie Nr. 115
- Divisions-Nachrichten-Kommandeur 115
