= Great Retreat (Russia) =

1915 strategic withdrawal by Russian forces on the Eastern Front of World War I

- Part of the Eastern Front of World War I
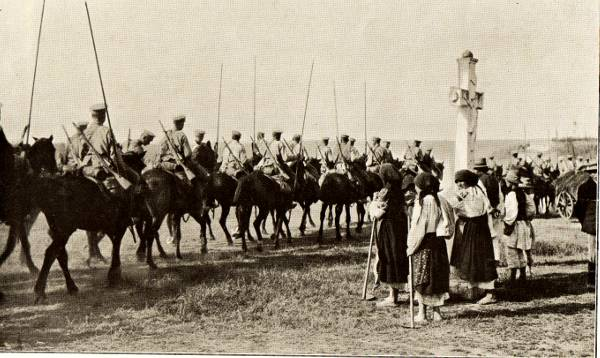
- Russian withdrawal in 1915.
Date	13 July – 19 September 1915
Location	Galicia and Lodomeria, Congress Poland and Western Krai
Result	Central Powers victory
Territorial changes	Central Powers capture Congress Poland and most of Galicia, Lithuania and Courland and Semigallia; Establishment of the Government General of Warsaw by Germany; Establishment of the Military General Government of Lublin by Austria-Hungary; Establishment of the Kingdom of Poland in 1917

Belligerents
German Empire Austria-Hungary: (Poland) Polish Legions	Russian Empire: Congress Poland

Commanders and leaders
(German Empire) Wilhelm II (German Empire) Erich von Falkenhayn (German Empire) Paul von Hindenburg (German Empire) Erich Ludendorff (German Empire) August von Mackensen (German Empire) Prince Leopold of Bavaria (Austria-Hungary) Franz Joseph I (Austria-Hungary) Franz Conrad von Hötzendorf (Austria-Hungary) Arthur Arz von Straußenburg (Poland) Józef Piłsudski	(Russian Empire) Nicholas II (Russian Empire) Grand Duke Nikolai (Russian Empire) Mikhail Alekseyev (Russian Empire) Pavel Yengalychev (Russian Empire) Nikolai Ivanov (Russian Empire) Aleksei Brusilov

Strength
Initially: Central Powers; 2,411,353 men	Initially: 2,975,695 men

Casualties and losses
13 July – 28 August 1915: 358,634 KIA, MIA, WIA lost: 38 machine guns 203 guns German Empire: 239,975 KIA, MIA, WIA; Austria-Hungary: 118,659 KIA, MIA, WIA	13 July – 28 August 1915: Total: 1,005,911; 96,820 KIA; 429,742 WIA; 479,349 MIA lost: 1,115 machine guns 3,205 guns

The Great Retreat was a strategic withdrawal and evacuation on the Eastern Front of World War I in 1915. The Imperial Russian Army gave up the salient in Galicia and Congress Poland. The Russian Empire's critically under-equipped military suffered great losses in the Central Powers' July–September summer offensive operations, which led to the Stavka ordering a withdrawal to shorten the front lines and avoid the potential encirclement of large Russian forces in the salient. While the withdrawal itself was relatively well-conducted, it was a severe blow to Russian morale.

== Background ==
Following the German success with their Gorlice–Tarnów offensive, Hans von Seeckt proposed that August von Mackensen's 11th Army should advance north towards Brest-Litovsk, with their flanks shielded by the rivers Vistula and Bug. Mackensen and Chief of the German Great General Staff Erich von Falkenhayn supported this strategy of attacking the Russian salient in Poland, and forcing a decisive battle. Ober Ost, led by Paul von Hindenburg and Erich Ludendorff, would attack towards the southeast, while Mackensen turned north, and the Austro-Hungarian 2nd Army attacked east. The Ober Ost 12th Army, led by Max von Gallwitz, would advance to the northeast of Warsaw, while the 9th Army, led by Prince Leopold of Bavaria, the Woyrsch Corps, led by Remus von Woyrsch, and the Austro-Hungarian 1st Army, led by Paul Puhallo von Brlog, pushed the Russians eastward to the Vistula. The Army of the Bug, led by Alexander von Linsingen, the Austro-Hungarian 2nd and 7th Armies, led by Eduard von Böhm-Ermolli and Karl von Pflanzer-Baltin respectively, protected Mackensen's eastern flank. On Mackensen's western flank was the Austro-Hungarian 4th Army, led by Archduke Joseph Ferdinand.

On 24 June, the Russian Tsar Nicholas II met with his senior leaders in Baranovichi, where it was agreed to no longer defend the Polish salient. The new Russian line would run from Riga, Kaunas, Grodno, Brest-Litovsk, along the upper Bug, and then along the Dniester into Romania. The 3rd and 4th Armies were also placed under the control of Mikhail Alekseyev's Northwest Front, consisting of the 2nd, 1st, 12th, 10th and 5th Armies, deployed south to north. Alekseyev then planned a slow withdrawal from the salient.

The Ober Ost attack was to commence on 13 July, followed by Mackensen's advance on 15 July. The strategic Russian railway center of Włodzimierz Wołyński was an early priority of Mackensen.

== Offensive ==
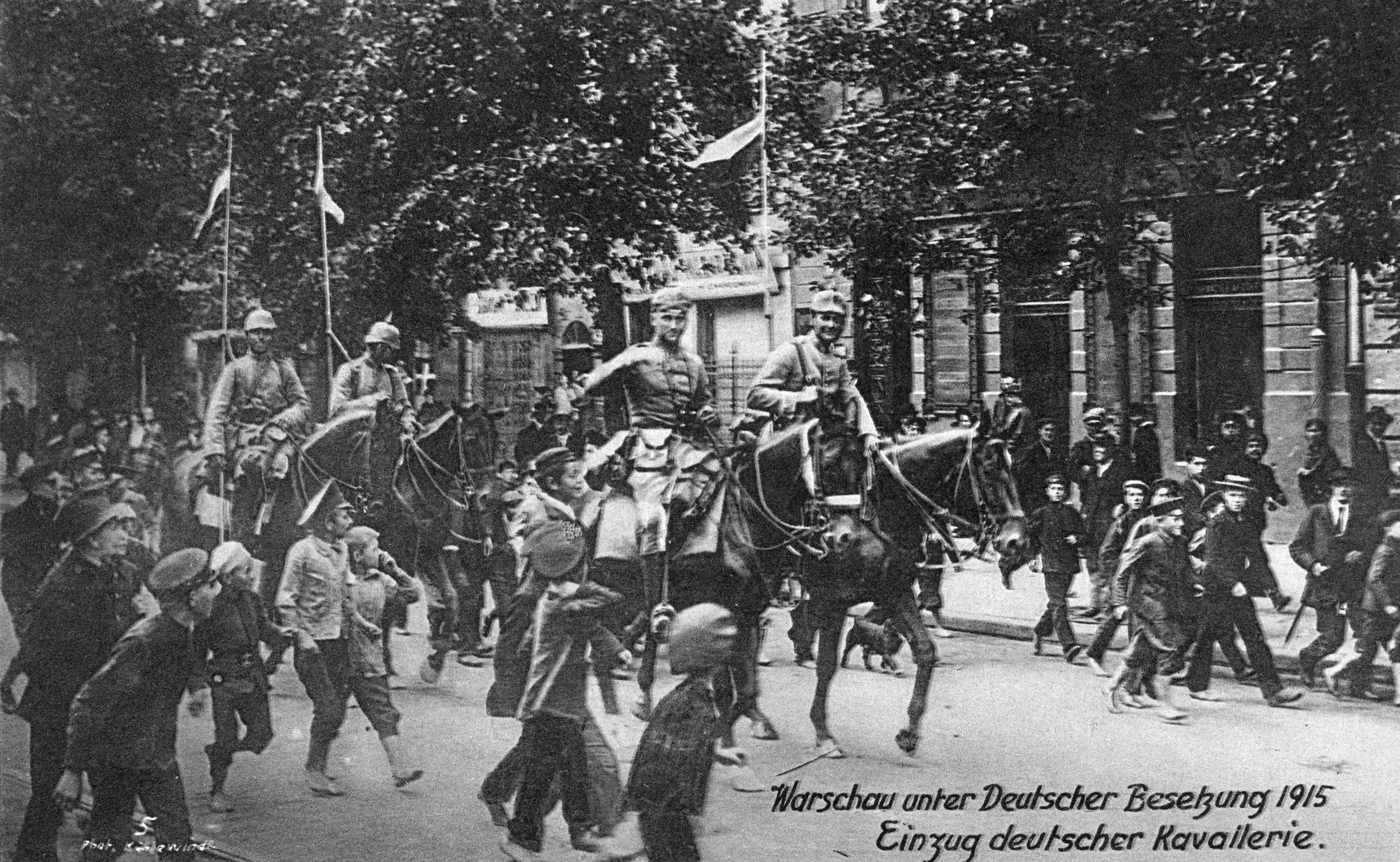
German cavalry entering Warsaw on August 5, 1915.

During the first two days of battle, Gallwitz's 12th Army pushed Alexander Litvinov's 1st Army back 9 miles (14 km) and captured 7,000 prisoners. By 17 July, Gallwitz's 12th Army and Friedrich von Scholtz's 8th Army had pushed the Russian 1st and 12th Armies to the Narew. On 14 July, the Austro-Hungarian 1st Army, redeployed from the south of Woyrsch Corps to the east of Mackensen, advanced towards Sokal. The 1st Army was then to form a bridgehead across the Bug, defended by the Russian 8th Army, which they achieved by 18 July, and commenced to move towards Włodzimierz Wołyński. On 15 July, the Bug Army overran Russian defenses, forcing their retreat. On 16 July, Mackensen's 11th Army overran the first line of Russian defenses, captured Krasnostaw, and about 6000 prisoners. By 18 July, they had advanced north 19 miles (31 km), and captured 15,000 prisoners. On 17 July, the Woyrsch Corps commenced its attack, and captured Radom.

On 22 July, as the Austro-Hungarian 4th Army advanced towards Lublin, Alexeyev ordered a retreat towards Ivangorod. On 23 July, Ober Ost was able to establish a bridgehead across the Narew at Pułtusk. At this stage of the battle, a swift breakthrough by the Central Powers became doubtful. In the words of Ludendorff, "The Russian Army was certainly forced to move [back], but it escaped. It launched constant determined counterattacks with powerful forces to reorganize and successfully mount prolonged resistance." Max Hoffmann noted, "It seems that the Russians are actually repeating [the events of] 1812 and retreating along the entire front. They are setting fire to hundreds of their own villages, whose inhabitants have been evacuated."

As the Russian army retreated, the Chief of the General Staff Nikolai Yanushkevich, supported by Grand Duke Nicholas, ordered the army to devastate the border territories and expel the "enemy" nations within. The Russian authorities deported 500,000 Jews and 250,000 Germans into the Russian interior. The Russian military leadership regarded Muslims, Germans and Poles as traitors and spies, while Jews were considered political unreliables.

On 29 July, Woyrsch established a bridgehead across the Vistula north of Ivangorod, forcing the Russians to abandon the fortress there. On 31 July, Mackensen captured Lublin, and on 1 August, the Bug Army captured Khelme. Alexeyev then ordered Warsaw to be abandoned, and on 5 August, Prince Leopold's 9th Army marched into the city. On 17 August, the German 10th Army captured Kaunas and its Fortress. The Novogeorgievsk Fortress was encircled by the Germans on 10 August, and Hans Hartwig von Beseler's siege guns forced its surrender on 20 August. The Osowiec Fortress was also eventually abandoned by the Russians, followed by a German chlorine gas attack. Kovel was abandoned by the Russians on 21 August, and Stavka abandoned Baranovichi for Mogilev.

Mackensen's 11th Army, and Linsingen's Bug Army, continued their northerly advance towards Brest-Litovsk, occupying the citadel on 26 August. Otto von Below's Army of the Niemen during Riga–Šiauliai offensive advanced into southern Latvia, while Scholtz's 10th Army advanced towards Vilnius, which was abandoned by the Russians on 17 September.

== Aftermath ==
Frontline before (brown) and after (red) the Great Retreat in 1915

On the 5th of September (23 August OS) the Tsar assumed command of the military, dismissing Grand Duke Nikolai, and Nikolai Yanushkevich. On that same day the new leadership of the Headquarters (Supreme Commander Nicholas II, Chief of Staff M.V. Alekseyev) issued a directive to end the Great Retreat. During the defensive and offensive operations in August–October 1915 the front was stabilized.

According to Prit Buttar, "...as far as Falkenhayn was concerned, he had achieved all that he could expect to achieve on the Eastern Front. Russia was clearly not going to accept a separate peace, and the complete destruction of the Russian Army had never been his intention. With so much territory gained and so much damage done to the Russians, it was highly likely that there would be no threat from the east for the foreseeable future."

== Casualties and losses ==
During the summer offensive, the troops of the Central Powers inflicted very heavy casualties on the Imperial Russian Army – in 45 days – up to 1,006,000 men. Of course, this was somewhat less than the Russian casualties in the previous Gorlice campaign (1,243,400 men in 75 days), (Note: Includes casualties on the entire Eastern front, not only Gorlice–Tarnów offensive) but on average, the casualties per day were higher – 22,300 men against 16,600. Such dynamics was affected, before of all, the fall of the Novogeorgievsk fortress and the capture by the Germans of its numerous garrison. The armies of the Central Powers suffered less casualties in July–August than in May–June (358,600 men against 535,300), but the daily average casualties also increased (from 7,000 to almost 8,000 men). At the same time, if in the Gorlice campaign the most severe casualties of the Central Powers were the casualties of the Austro-Hungarian troops (2.5 times more than the German ones), then in the general offensive the German troops already lost 2 times more men than their ally. Such dynamics allows us to conclude that the casualties of the armies of the Dual Monarchy in the Gorlice campaign affected their subsequent activity – namely, on the front south of the Bug. Also for the German Great General Staff, high casualties became one of the factors for refusing further offensive actions against the Russian Empire and switching to defense.

For the Russian side, the scale of the casualties suffered greatly affected the further planning of military operations, forcing them to abandon not only the transition to the offensive, but also the protracted battle in their positions. Particularly painful was the increase in the number of prisoners, despite the fact that the enemy constantly announced the size of the trophies. In total, the Central Powers announced the capture from mid-July to September 1 of 511,679 prisoners (of which 18 were generals and 2,923 officers), 1,076 machine guns and 3,205 guns (of which 2,941 were in fortresses). The number of prisoners declared to the International Committee of the Red Cross exceeds the number of missing, probably due to the prisoners taken in the last days of August, when the Austro-Hungarian troops began to attack Volhynia and the boom beyond Grodno and Vilnius, as well as a result of errors in calculations and underestimation of the missing among the rear units and services of Kaunas, Ivangorod, Łomża and Osowiec.

However, in this case, there is a tendency when almost all the missing are in captivity. The increase in the number of Russian prisoners, even in comparison with the Gorlice campaign, was primarily due to the surrender of the Novogeorgievsk garrison (almost 90,000 men). Despite the threats of repressive measures against both the so-called “voluntarily surrendered” and the families of prisoners (deprivation of government rations), the distribution of “stories” by order of the alleged mass destruction of those captured by the enemy, the proportion of missing remained large and outnumbered the number of wounded. The Chief of the staff of the Southwestern Front (whose troops in July–August suffered casualties as prisoners to a much lesser extent), General of Artillery N. Ivanov, on August 10, ordered all commanding persons to conduct thorough investigations of "such shameful phenomena for the Russian warrior" when " a very large, unprecedented in the Russian army, the number of military ranks missing during marches and battles, a significant and even most of which either disperse, making escapes, or surrender to the enemy". Ivanov emphasized: “Senior commanders must show special care and forethought in preventing these phenomena that shame our army”.

Along with objective factors - the severity of the battles, when shelters and trenches were destroyed during prolonged shelling, burying soldiers under them, night crossings in a state of extreme fatigue, continuous retreat – subjective factors also influenced the increase in the number of missing persons, namely the weakness of officers and non-commissioned officers, poor training of replenishment. A glaring fact of the fall in the level of training of young soldiers was the incident with the 12th company of the 164th Reserve Battalion, sent on July 17, 1915, to replenish the 61st Infantry Division. On July 20, on the 4th day of the march, the company fled; out of 250 men, only six came to their destination.

The number of wounded in the fingers Russians continued to grow, which caused repeated criticism from the commanders, threats of reprisals and even condemnation by courts-martial to death of those convicted of self-mutilation. After the beginning of the July fighting, the chief of staff of the 2nd Siberian Army Corps ordered not to evacuate the wounded in the fingers and hands, but to bring them to justice; regimental commanders were required to submit monthly reports on the number of lower ranks with such wounds.

During the repulse of the summer offensive of the Central Powers, Russian troops captured 281 officers and 20,353 soldiers, as well as 25 machine guns. Given this number, it can be assumed that on the Central Powers's side the death toll could rise to 101,064 men (71,523 on the German side and 29,541 on the Austro-Hungarian side), which exceeds the number of deaths on the Russian side. Such serious damage clearly affected the position of the Chief of the German Great General Staff, E. von Falkenhayn, who insisted on the immediate curtailment of the offensive and the transition to defense in the achieved advantageous positions. But in general, the casualties of the Imperial Russian Army turned out to be almost three times higher than that of the Central Powers, mainly due to the prisoners (a ratio of more than 20:1).

== See also ==
- Bug-Narew Offensive
- Vistula-Bug offensive
- Siege of Novogeorgievsk
- Riga–Šiauliai offensive
- Siege of Kaunas (1915)
- Zolota Lypa-Dniestr battle

== References & Notes ==
=== Bibliography ===
- Oleynikov, Alexei (2024). Великое отступление и стабилизация восточного фронта [The Great Retreat and stabilization of the Eastern Front]. Moscow: Вече. ISBN 978-5-4484-4482-1.
- Nelipovich, Sergey (2022). Русский фронт Первой мировой войны. Потери сторон. 1915 [Russian Front of the First World War. Casualties of the Sides. 1915] (in Russian). ISBN 978-5-91791-447-3.
- Borisyuk, Andrey (2024). Забытая война. Россия в 1914-1918 [The forgotten war. Russia in 1914-1918] (in Russian). Moscow: Вече. ISBN 978-5-4484-5078-5.
- Baberowski, Jörg; Doering-Manteuffel, Anselm (2009). Geyer, Michael; Fitzpatrick, Sheila (eds.). Beyond Totalitarianism: Stalinism and Nazism compared. Cambridge University Press. ISBN 978-0-521-89796-9.
- McMeekin, Sean (2017). The Russian Revolution: A New History. London: Basic Books. ISBN 978-0-46503-990-6.
- DiNardo, Richard (2010). Breakthrough:The Gorlice-Tarnow Campaign, 1915. ISBN 9780313081835.
