= Otto von Lauenstein =

Prussian General (1857-1916)

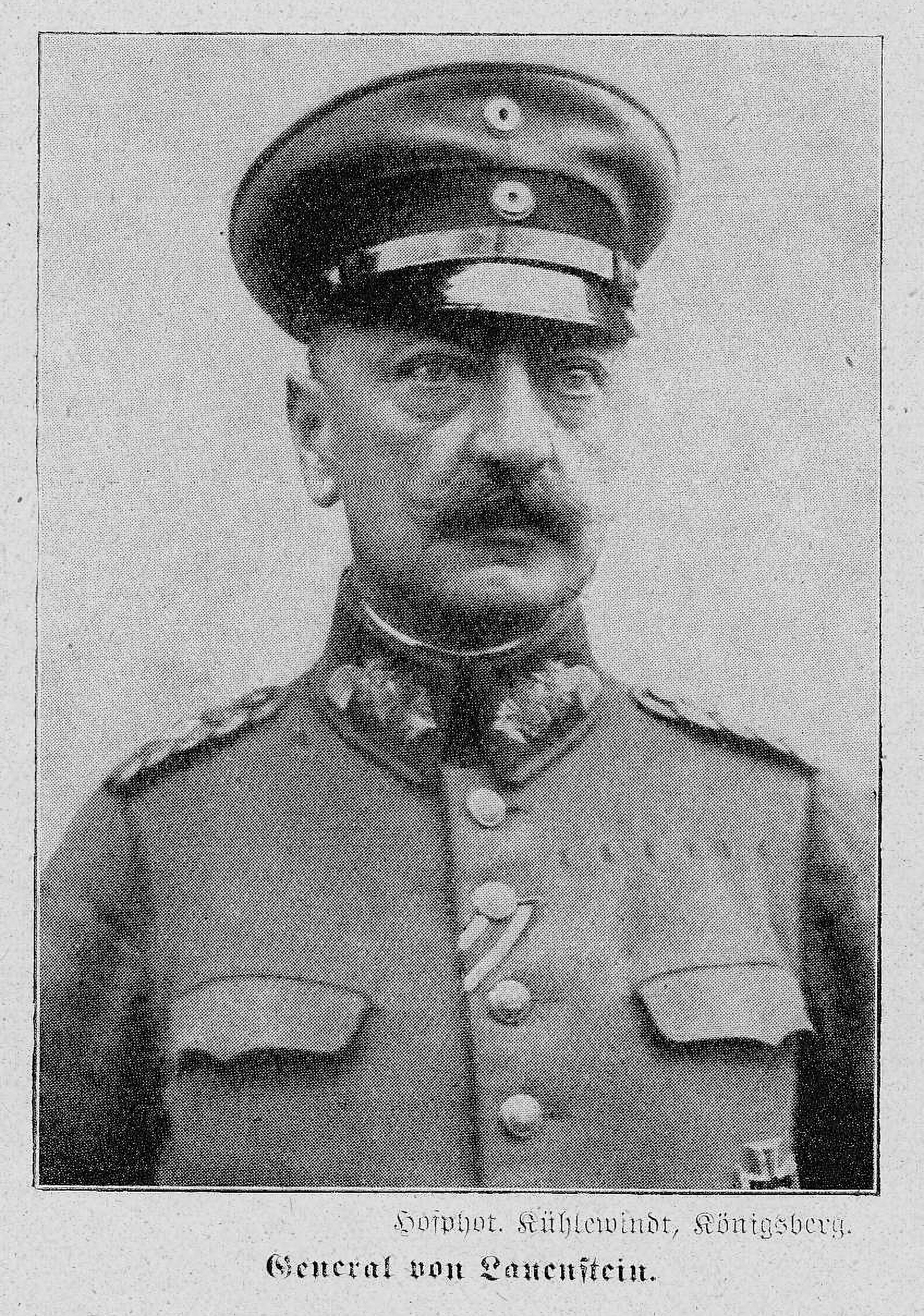
- General Otto von Lauenstein
- Born: 1 February 1857; Lüneburg, Kingdom of Saxony
- Died: 19 May 1916 (aged 59) Düsseldorf, German Empire
- Allegiance: Kingdom of Prussia; German Empire
- Branch: Prussian Army; Imperial German Army
- Service years: 1876–1916
- Rank: Generalleutnant
- Commands: 38th Field Artillery Regiment; 38th Infantry Brigade; 14th Division; XXXIX Reserve Corps; Army Group Lauenstein
- Conflicts: Boxer Rebellion; World War I
- Spouse: Julie Martha Meyer

Ernst August Anton Hermann Otto von Lauenstein (1 February 1857 – 3 October 1916) was a Prussian Generalleutnant who served during World War I. He was chief of staff of the 2nd Army and later commanded the XXXIX Reserve Corps.

== Life ==
Lauenstein was born on 1 February 1857 in Lüneburg. Until 1875 he attended the Lüneburg Gymnasium. In 1876, he was appointed as a Second Lieutenant in the 18th Field Artillery Regiment. From 1892 to 1900 he was a military attaché in St. Petersburg. In 1901, he was sent to China to serve on the staff of Alfred von Waldersee. The same year, he returned to Germany and commanded the 38th Field Artillery Regiment.

On 24 April 1904 he was sent to Russia as Prussian military envoy with the Russian Army in Manchuria. He accordingly observed the Russo-Japanese War. For Alfred von Schlieffen, Lauenstein was important. Lauenstein reported that the Russian officers are not responsibly but only care about their comfort. This assessment helped Schlieffen to conclude that Russia would not be able to counterattack Prussian forces.

In 1905, he was a section chief of the General Staff. On 13 February 1906, Lauenstein was promoted to Oberst. The same year, he became an aide-de-camp of Emperor Wilhelm II. On 27 January 1908, Lauestein was ennobled. On 22 March 1910, Lauenstein became Generalmajor and on 3 May 1910, was named commander of 38th Infantry Brigade. In 1911, he was sent to Russia again, as Prussian military envoy at the Imperial Court. He returned to Germany later in the same year and became Chief of Staff of the VI Corps, commanded by Karl von Pritzelwitz. On 1 October 1912, he was promoted to Generalleutnant and given command of the 14th Division.

During World War I he first was the Chief of Staff of the 2nd Army, which played a big role in the Schlieffen Plan. In December 1914, Lauenstein received command of the XXXIX Reserve Corps. As the corps commander he participated in the Second Battle of the Masurian Lakes. In 1915 he simultaneously commanded the Army Group Lauenstein, which consisted of 78th Reserve Division, the 6th Reserve Division, Manred von Richthofen's cavalry command and a Landwehr detachment. The small army group was engaged in the western region of Latvia. Lauenstein's army group participated in Kurland Offensive. Against Mikhail Alekseyev, his twelve division captured Šiauliai against Alekseyev's eighteen divisions. However, in July 1916, his illness brought his permanent convalescent leave. Lauenstein died on 3 October 1916.

== Family ==
On 29 November 1903 he married Julie Martha Meyer. They had five children.
