= 8th Bavarian Reserve Division =

8th Bavarian Reserve Division (8. Bayerische Reserve-Division)
- Active: 1914-1919
- Country: Kingdom of Bavaria; German Empire
- Branch: Army
- Type: Infantry
- Size: Approx. 12,500
- Engagements: World War I: Gorlice-Tarnów Offensive, Battle of Lemberg (1915), Battle of the Somme, Romanian Campaign, Battle of the Lys

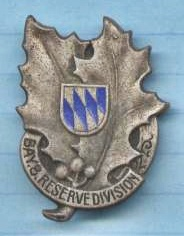
Bavarian Reserve Infantry Division, Cap Badge, 1917.

The 8th Bavarian Reserve Division (8. Bayerische Reserve-Division) was a unit of the Imperial German Army in World War I. The division was formed at the end of December 1914 and organized over the next month, arriving in the line in late January 1915. It was part of the second large wave of new divisions formed at the outset of World War I. The division was disbanded in 1919, during the demobilization of the German Army after World War I. The division was recruited in the Kingdom of Bavaria and was considered to be skilled in mountain warfare.

== Combat chronicle ==
The 8th Bavarian Reserve Division initially fought on the Western Front, seeing its first action in the trenches in Alsace, where it remained until May 1915. It was then transferred to the Eastern Front, fighting in the breakthrough battle at Lubaczów and in the 1915 Battle of Lemberg. It was sent back to the Western Front in July, again fighting in Alsace, where it remained until July 1916. From 19 July to 22 August, it fought in the Battle of the Somme. In October 1916, the division entered the Romanian Campaign, where it engaged in mountain warfare. The division remained in combat in various parts of Romania until December 1916, and then engaged in positional warfare in Transylvania until July 1917, when it went back on the offensive. In October 1917, the division returned to the Western Front, fighting in Flanders. It fought in the trenches and saw action in the Battle of Armentières in April 1918, part of the Battle of the Lys (also known as the Lys Offensive and the Fourth Battle of Ypres). It continued fighting along the Western Front until the end of the war. Allied intelligence rated the division as first class.

== Order of battle on formation ==
The 8th Bavarian Reserve Division, unlike the other divisions of its wave and like earlier German divisions, was initially organized as a square division. The order of battle of the division on 31 December 1914 was as follows:

- 15.Bayer. Reserve-Infanterie-Brigade
  - Kgl. Bayer. Reserve-Infanterie-Regiment Nr. 18
  - Kgl. Bayer. Reserve-Infanterie-Regiment Nr. 19
- 16. Bayer. Reserve-Infanterie-Brigade
  - Kgl. Bayer. Reserve-Infanterie-Regiment Nr. 22
  - Kgl. Bayer. Reserve-Infanterie-Regiment Nr. 23
  - Kgl. Bayerische Reserve-Radfahrer-Kompanie Nr. 8
- Kgl. Bayer. Reserve-Kavallerie-Abteilung Nr. 8
- Kgl. Bayer. Reserve-Feldartillerie-Regiment Nr. 8
- Kgl. Bayer. Reserve-Feldartillerie-Regiment Nr. 9
- 3. Batterie/Kgl. Bayer. Reserve-Fußartillerie-Bataillon Nr. 6
- Kgl. Bayer. Reserve-Pionier-Bataillon Nr. 2
  - Kgl. Bayer. Reserve-Pionier-Kompanie Nr. 8
  - Kgl. Bayer. Reserve-Pionier-Kompanie Nr. 9

== Order of battle on 28 June 1918 ==
The division was triangularized in October 1916, losing the 15th Bavarian Reserve Infantry Brigade headquarters and the 18th Bavarian Reserve Infantry Regiment. Over the course of the war, other changes took place, including the formation of artillery and signals commands. The order of battle on 28 June 1918, was as follows:

- 16. Bayer. Reserve-Infanterie-Brigade
  - Kgl. Bayer. Reserve-Infanterie-Regiment Nr. 19
  - Kgl. Bayer. Reserve-Infanterie-Regiment Nr. 22
  - Kgl. Bayer. Reserve-Infanterie-Regiment Nr. 23
- Kgl. Bayer. Reserve-Kavallerie-Abteilung Nr. 8
- Kgl. Bayer. Artillerie-Kommandeur 8
  - Kgl. Bayer. Reserve-Feldartillerie-Regiment Nr. 9
  - Kgl. Bayer. Fußartillerie-Bataillon Nr. 19
- Kgl. Bayer. Pionier-Bataillon Nr. 20
- Kgl. Bayer. Divisions-Nachrichten-Kommandeur 408
