= 65th Infantry Division (Russian Empire) =

- 65-я пехотная дивизия
- Active: 1914–1918
- Country: Russian Empire
- Branch: Russian Imperial Army
- Role: Infantry

The 65th Infantry Division (Russian: 65-я пехотная дивизия, 65-ya Pekhotnaya Diviziya) was an infantry formation of the Russian Imperial Army.

== Organization ==
- 1st Brigade
  - 257th Infantry Regiment
  - 258th Infantry Regiment
- 2nd Brigade
  - 259th Infantry Regiment
  - 260th Infantry Regiment
