= 78th Reserve Division (German Empire) =

German military unit active during WWI

78th Reserve Division (78. Reserve-Division)
- Active: 1914-1918
- Country: Germany
- Branch: Army
- Type: Infantry
- Size: Approx. 12,500
- Engagements: World War I: Second Battle of the Masurian Lakes, Gorlice-Tarnów Offensive, Second Battle of the Aisne, Second Battle of the Marne, Battle of Château-Thierry (1918)

The 78th Reserve Division (78. Reserve-Division) was a unit of the Imperial German Army in World War I. The division was formed at the end of December 1914 and organized over the next month, arriving in the line in early February 1915. It was part of the second large wave of new divisions formed at the outset of World War I, which were numbered the 75th through 82nd Reserve Divisions. The division was initially part of XXXIX Reserve Corps. The division was disbanded in September 1918 and its assets distributed to other units. The division was relatively mixed. The 258th Reserve Infantry Regiment was from the Prussian Rhine Province, the 259th Reserve Infantry Regiment was from the Grand Duchy of Oldenburg, and the 260th Reserve Infantry Regiment was mainly from the Prussian Province of Hanover, with troops from the Duchy of Brunswick as well.

== Combat chronicle ==
The 78th Reserve Division initially fought on the Eastern Front, seeing its first action in the Second Battle of the Masurian Lakes. In May 1915, it participated in a raid into Lithuania and Courland. It later fought in the Gorlice-Tarnów Offensive, and fought before Daugavpils from September to November 1915. It remained in positional warfare before Daugavpils until April 1917, after which it was transferred to the Western Front. It fought in the Second Battle of the Aisne, also called the Third Battle of Champagne (and called by the Germans the Double Battle on the Aisne and in the Champagne). It resisted the French offensive at Verdun in August and September 1917. In 1918, it fought in the Second Battle of the Marne, including in the Battle of Château-Thierry. After fighting between the Marne and the Vesle, the division was dissolved, with the remnants being distributed to other units. Allied intelligence rated the division as third class.

== Order of battle on formation ==
The 78th Reserve Division, like the other divisions of its wave and unlike earlier German divisions, was organized from the outset as a triangular division. The order of battle of the division on December 29, 1914, was as follows:

- 78.Reserve-Infanterie-Brigade
  - Reserve-Infanterie-Regiment Nr. 258
  - Reserve-Infanterie-Regiment Nr. 259
  - Reserve-Infanterie-Regiment Nr. 260
  - Reserve-Radfahrer-Kompanie Nr. 78
- Reserve-Kavallerie-Abteilung Nr. 78
- 78.Reserve-Feldartillerie-Brigade
  - Reserve-Feldartillerie-Regiment Nr. 61
  - Reserve-Feldartillerie-Regiment Nr. 62
- Reserve-Pionier-Kompanie Nr. 80

== Order of battle on January 4, 1918 ==
The most significant wartime structural change in the divisions of this wave was the reduction from two field artillery regiments to one. Over the course of the war, other changes took place, including the formation of artillery and signals commands and the enlargement of combat engineer support to a full pioneer battalion. The order of battle on January 4, 1918, was as follows:

- 78.Reserve-Infanterie-Brigade
  - Reserve-Infanterie-Regiment Nr. 258
  - Reserve-Infanterie-Regiment Nr. 259
  - Reserve-Infanterie-Regiment Nr. 260
- 2.Eskadron/Husaren-Regiment Kaiser Franz Josef von Österreich, König von Ungarn (Schleswig-Holsteinisches) Nr. 16
- Artillerie-Kommandeur 78
  - Reserve-Feldartillerie-Regiment Nr. 62
  - Fußartillerie-Bataillon Nr. 86 (from May 3, 1918)
- Pionier-Bataillon Nr. 378
  - Reserve-Pionier-Kompanie Nr. 79
  - Reserve-Pionier-Kompanie Nr. 80
  - Minenwerfer-Kompanie Nr. 278
- Divisions-Nachrichten-Kommandeur 478
