= Pleshkov =

Pleshkov or Pleshkoff (Russian: Плешков) is a Russian surname that may refer to:

- Andrey Pleshkov (born 1982), Olympic rower from Belarus
- Mikhail Pleshkov (?-1956), Russian Olympic equestrian
- Mikhail Mikhailovich Pleshkov (1856–1927), Russian general
- Julia Pleshkova (born 1997), Russian Olympic alpine skier
- Olga Pleshkova (born 1956), Russian Olympic speed skater
