= Mikhail Mikhailovich Pleshkov =

Russian general (1856–1927)

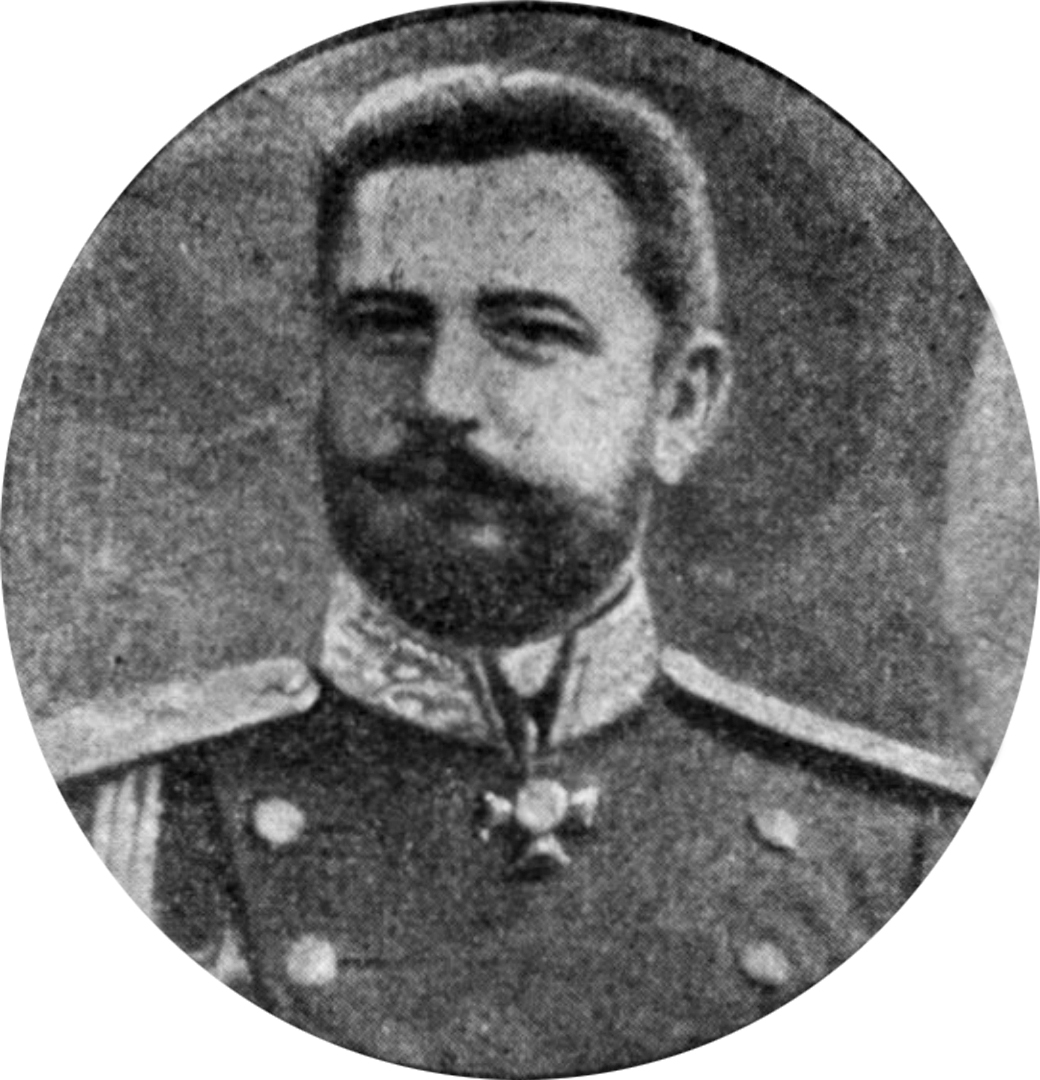
- Born: 13 November 1856; Russian Empire
- Died: 21 May 1927 (aged 70) Harbin, China
- Allegiance: Russian Empire; Russian Republic; (Russian Republic) White Movement
- Branch: (Russian Empire) Imperial Russian Army; (Russian Republic) Russian Army; (Russian Republic) White Army
- Service years: 1876–1917, 1918– ?
- Rank: General of the Cavalry
- Commands: 29th Dragoon Odessa Regiment; 2nd Brigade, 2nd Cavalry Division; 7th Cavalry Division; 1st Siberian Army Corps
- Conflicts: World War I; Great Retreat; Lake Naroch Offensive; Russian Civil War
- Awards: Order of Saint Stanislaus; Order of Saint Anna; Order of Saint Vladimir; St. George Sword; Order of Saint George; Order of the White Eagle; Order of Saint Alexander Nevsky

Mikhail Mikhailovich Pleshkov (Russian: Михаил Михайлович Плешков) (13 November [O.S. 1 November] 1856 – 21 May 1927) was an Imperial Russian Army division and corps commander who achieved the rank of general of the cavalry. After the October Revolution, he fought for the White movement against the Bolsheviks in the Russian Civil War, and after the Bolshevik victory he emigrated to the Republic of China. His son, Mikhail Pleshkov, also served as a general in the White Army in the Russian Far East.

== Biography ==
=== Early life ===
A Siberian Cossack, Pleshkov was descended from the nobility of the Mogilev Governorate. He was born in the village of Nikolayev on 13 November (1 November O.S.) 1856. He graduated from the Voronezh Military Gymnasium in 1874, then attended the 1st Pavlovsk School and the Nikolaev Cavalry School. Upon graduating from the latter in 1876, he began his career in the Imperial Russian Army.

=== Early military career ===
Pleshkov graduated from the Nikolaev Military Academy in 1884.

On 6 March 1894, Pleshkov was appointed chief of staff of the 1st Don Cossack Division, on 3 March 1898, he took command of the 29th Dragoon Odessa Regiment, and on 25 January 1902 he became commanding officer of the 2nd Brigade of the 2nd Cavalry Division. On 15 June 1907, he took command of the 7th Cavalry Division. On 11 May 1912, he became commander of the 1st Siberian Army Corps, made up of the 1st Siberian Rifle Division and 2nd Siberian Rifle Division.

=== World War I ===
Pleshkov was still the commander of the 1st Siberian Army Corps when the Russian Empire entered World War I on 1 August 1914, and he went through almost the entire war with the corps, distinguishing himself as a good commander. At the beginning of the war, his corps thrown into battle without artillery, but saved Russian troops at Pyasechny. For battles near Riga in 1914 he was awarded the St. George Sword. Then he fought at Łódź and Przasnysz.

As the Imperial Russian Army conducted a massive strategic withdrawal during the "Great Retreat" of July–September 1915, the 1st Siberian Rifle Corps saw action on the Narew in July 1915, in which Pleshkov's the 2nd and 11th Siberian Rifle Divisions withstood the onslaught of the numerically superior German 12th Army. In March 1916, Pleshkov led the northern group of the Russian 2nd Army during the unsuccessful Russian Lake Naroch Offensive. Pleshkov's corps later fought in the Pripyat Marshes region.

=== Revolution and Russian Civil War ===
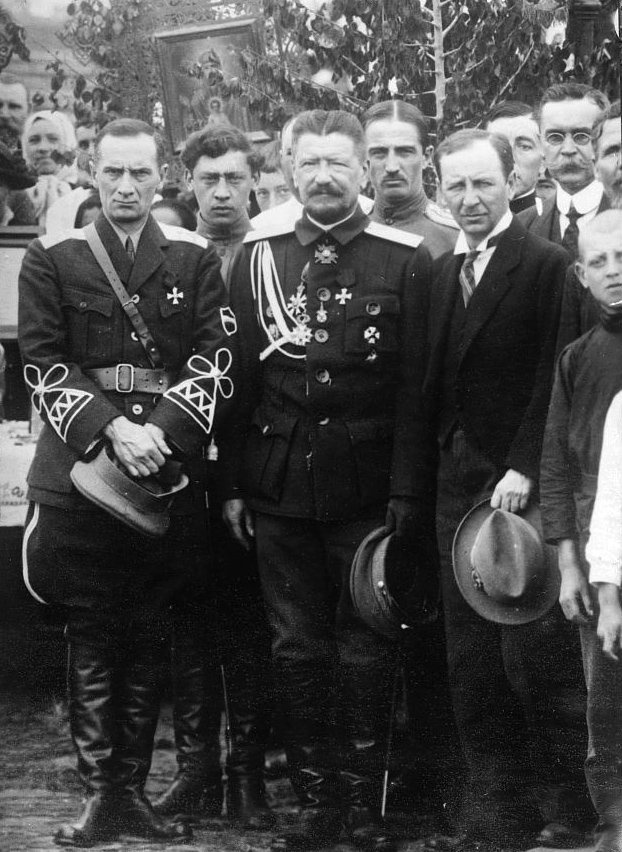
Pleshkov (center) with Admiral Alexander Kolchak (left) and Dr. Pavel Popov (right) in 1918

In the February Revolution of 1917, Tsar Nicholas II was overthrown and the Russian Provisional Government proclaimed a new Russian Republic. Pleshkov stayed on in the post-imperial Russian Army, but in mid-1917, soldiers removed him from command of the 1st Siberian Army Corps. On 3 July 1917, allegedly due to illness, he was transferred to the reserve of the headquarters of the Minsk Military District.

When the Bolsheviks overthrew the Russian Provisional Government in the October Revolution on 7 November 1917, the Russian Civil War broke out. Pleshkov supported the anti-Bolshevik White movement and resumed active service in the White Army. In 1918 he became the head of White Army troops in the Russian Far East and on 23–24 August 1918 he led White Army forces in an attempted armed coup in Vladivostok. On 24 December 1918, he became the commander-in-chief in the exclusion zone of the Chinese Eastern Railway. He also took part in battles with Red Army forces on the eastern front of the Russian Civil War. In 1919, he became chairman of the Committee for Assistance to Russian Disabled Persons.

== Later life ==
After the Bolshevik victory in the Russian Civil War, Pleshkov emigrated to the Republic of China. He settled in Harbin, where he worked in the management of the Chinese Eastern Railway and in 1922 became a member of the Society of Guard Officers in the Far East.

In 1923, Pleshkov formed a detachment of White Army officers in to serve in the army of the Chinese warlord Generalissimo Zhang Zuolin. About 300 men initially responded to his call for volunteers. This formation served as the basis for the deployment in 1924 under the leadership of the warlord, General Zhang Zongchang of the 1st Separate Russian (Nechaevsky) Brigade.

Pleshkov died in Harbin on 21 May 1927.

== Awards ==
=== Russian ===
- Order of Saint Stanislaus Third Class (1886)
- Order of Saint Anna Third Class (1895)
- Order of Saint Stanislaus (House of Romanov) Second Class (1900)
- Order of Saint Vladimir Third Class (1906)
- Order of Saint Stanislaus First Class (6 December 1910)
- Order of Saint Anna First Class (6 December 1913)
- St. George Sword (26 November 1914)
- Order of Saint George Fourth Class (10 March 1915)
- Order of the White Eagle (9 April 1915)
- Order of Saint Alexander Nevsky (15 March 1916)

=== Foreign ===
- Commander of the Order of the Oak Crown (Luxembourg, 1901)

Preceded by	Commander of the 7th Cavalry Division; 1907–1912	Succeeded by
Preceded by Arkady Nikanorovich Nishenkov	Commander of the 1st Siberian Army Corps; May 1912 – July 1917	Succeeded by Eugene A. Iskritsky
