= Platon Lechitsky =

Russian general of infantry

Platon Alekseevich Lechitsky
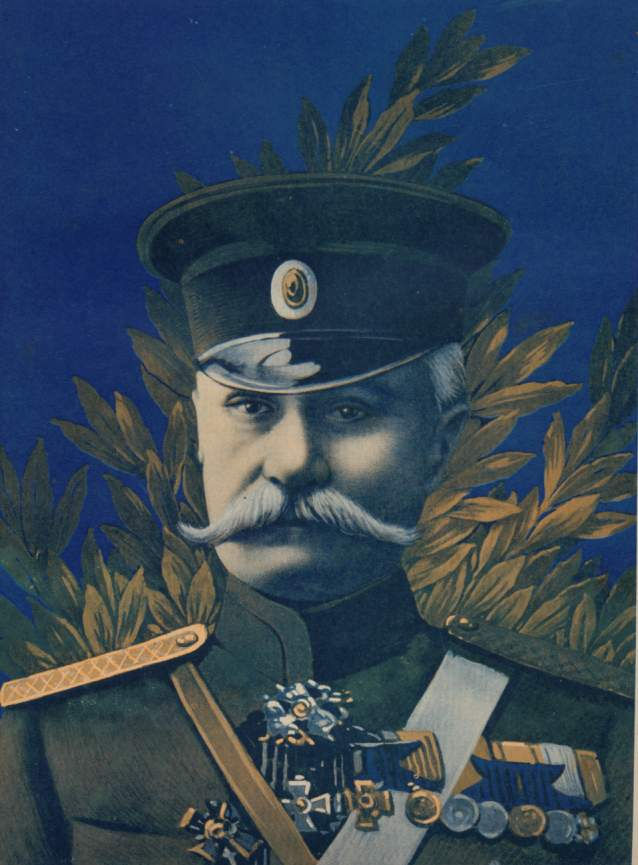
- Born: 18 March 1856; Grodno Governorate, Russian Empire
- Died: 2 February 1921 (aged 64) Moscow, Soviet Union
- Allegiance: Russian Empire
- Branch: (Russian Empire) Imperial Russian Army
- Commands: 1st Siberian Rifle Regiment; 1st Guards Infantry Division (Russian Empire); 9th Army (Russian Empire)
- Conflicts: Boxer Rebellion; Battle of Fonigou; Russo-Japanese War; Battle of Ufanguansk; World War I; Dniester Front; 1st Khotyn Operation; Prut Operation; 2nd Khotyn Operation; Transnistrian Operation; First Battle of Dniester; Russian Civil War

Platon Alekseevich Lechitsky (Russian: Платон Алексеевич Лечицкий; 18 March 1856 – 2 February 1921) was a Russian general.

== Biography ==
Lechitski was born in the Grodno province to rural priest Alexei Nikolaevich and his wife Sofia Alexandrovna (née Pavlovskaya) Lechitsky. His father graduated from the Lithuanian Theological Seminary in 1849, was ordained priest on 14 September 1851, and served in the diocese of Grodno. Lechitsky entered the seminary but was dismissed from grade 1 as he failed to appear for the whole academic year.

On 25 March 1877, Lechitsky entered the military service as a private on the rights of self-determining 3rd rank in the 7th grenadier Samogit adjutant general Count Totleben regiment, stationed in Moscow. In August, he was sent to study at the Warsaw Infantry Junker School. He graduated from the 2nd category in 1879 and received the rank of praporshchik.

In October 1879, he began serving in the 39th Infantry Reserve Personnel Battalion, stationed in Brest-Litovsk. He was promoted through the ranks from 1880 to 1889, where he was promoted to captain. As captain, in February 1891, Lechitsky was transferred to the 6th East Siberian Line Battalion and then, in June 1892, to the 5th East Siberian Rifle Battalion. From 24 October 1893, to 28 August 1894, he studied at the Officer Rifle School. He was promoted to lieutenant colonel in February 1896. On 24 November 1898, he was sent as part of a detachment to occupy the Port Arthur fortress with his battalion, renamed the 4th East Siberian Rifle Regiment.

=== Chinese camping ===
In 1900, at the opening of hostilities against the Chinese during the Boxer Rebellion, the 4th East Siberian Rifle Regiment was appointed to the North Manchurian detachment of General Vladimir Viktorovich Sakharov. Lechitsky carried out a reconnaissance on 27 July for the city of Boyans, occupied by Boxers. From 4 to 6 August, in the Sakharov detachment, Lechitsky participated in the battle near the city of Azhihe. Commanding a separate detachment of 2 companies and 1 hundred security guards of the Chinese Eastern Railway, in October 1900, Lechitsky survived a battle with Boxers by the village of Fonigou, near the city of Kuanchenzi. In early 1901, when, an expedition was organized from the troops of the southern Manchurian detachment to eastern Mongolia to the city of Kulo, Lechitsky commanded a convoy aimed at providing an important railway station node in Kabanzi.

Produced for fights difference in colonels, Lechitsky was temporally appointed commander of the 1st Siberian Rifle Regiment E.V. and military commander of Mukden. On 2 September 1902, Lechitsky was appointed commander of the 7th Caucasian Rifle Battalion, but, after not accepting the appointment, on 3 November received the 24th East Siberian Rifle Regiment.

=== Russo-Japanese war ===
In September 1904, Lechitsky marched with a regiment from Liaoyang to Fynhuangcheng and on to Yala. On 11 April, Lechitsky was entrusted with protecting a section of the Yalu River from the village of Syndyagou to s. Kuluza, over 18 miles, with a detachment from the battalion of the 24th East Siberian Rifle Regiment, a company of the 10th East Siberian Rifle Regiment, the 1st East Siberian Mountain Battery and two hundred. Having made a forced transition of 44 miles, Lechitsky at dawn on 12 April arrived at the mouth of the river.

On April 18, 1904, the Battle of the Yalu River broke out. Lechitsky only received information about the battle from the Chinese on the 19th and on the 21st joined the right column of the Eastern detachment, retreating to Modulinsky Pass. On 1 May, all parts of the Eastern detachment retreated to Lyandansyan, leaving the advanced units at the passes, including on Modulinsky — the Lechitsky detachment from the 24th V.-Sib. page pp. with 2 op. and 1 hundred. kaz. 14 June, by order of the head of Vost. detachment of the 24th V.-Sib. p. n. moved to Thavuan, forming a general reserve.

On 4 July, Lechitsky took part in the establishment of a part of the East detachment (26 battalions) to Ufanguansk passage. For outstanding service in previous battles, he was awarded the Order of St. George of the 4th degree, and on 11 August granted by the adjutant wing to His Imperial Majesty. On 10 August, Lechitsky with his regiment took the right-side section of the Landasyansky position near the village of Kofintszy, and on 13 August. With rearguard battles, Lechitsky on 15 August retreated to the forefront of Liaoyang, with his position located in the vicinity of the village of Mindyafan, and on 16 August he occupied a site at Tsofantunsky, which he defended in the days of the Liaoyang battle.

During the Chechen attack, Lechitsky became a member of the left column of the III Siberian Corps and from 25 to 30 September participated in the actions of these corps at Bensihu. At the very beginning of the Mukden operation, as soon as the Japanese attack was discovered against the Tsinchechen detachment, the commander-in-chief sent Major General Danilov (23rd and 24th regiments) from the 2nd Army to support the brigade, which occupied the night of 15 February 1905, position on the Tsandansky heights, near the village of Kudyaz. In these positions, until 23 February, Lechitsky, together with other parts of General Danilov's detachment, repulsed all the enemy's attacks, until an order was issued to withdraw the 1st Army across the Yellow River.

On 12 May 1905, Lechitsky was promoted to major general for military distinctions, and on 5 August he was appointed commander of the 1st brigade of the 6th East Siberian Infantry Division. On 15 August, he was enrolled in His Majesty's Suite. On 10 March 1906, Lechitsky was appointed commander of the 6th East Siberian Rifle Division, and on 21 July as commander of the 1st Guards Infantry Division. It is noteworthy that Lechitsky did not have a higher military education, as he did not graduate from the Nikolaev Academy of the General Staff, but this did not in the least prevent him from making a career in the Russian Imperial Army. On 12 December 1906, he was bestowed the tunic of the 24th East Siberian Rifle Regiment, and on 26 August 1908, he was appointed commander of the XVIII Army Corps. On 5 October 1908, he was promoted to lieutenant general (with seniority as of 14 February 1909) and on 23 December 1910, he was appointed commander of the forces of the Amur Military District.

=== World War I ===
At the beginning of the war, Lechitsky commanded a group of troops aimed at helping the 4th Army after its failure at Krasnik. On 9 August 1914, he stood at the head of the 9th Army and went through the whole battle campaign with it. Alongside the Brusilov 8th Army, it turned out to be the most combat-ready formation of all the Russian armed forces. The very first actions of Lechitsky as commander made him known as a decisive, energetic and proactive commander. During the general offensive of the Southwestern Front, the Ninth Army overturned the opposing enemy, taking on 2 September 1914 the Polish city of Sandomierz and creating a bridgehead on the San River to attack Krakow. For the Battle of Galicia, General Lechitsky was the first in the Great War to receive one of the highest awards of the Russian Army: the St. George's weapon with diamonds. In total, during the period of 1914–1916, only eight people were awarded this award.

The counterattack of the Austro-Germans, which followed that same September, forced the 9th Army to retreat and defend itself on the Vistula line in the vicinity of the Ivangorod fortress. In the battles in the front of Ivangorod, Russian troops waited for the defeat of the Germans near Warsaw and on 13 October went on the offensive. On 2 November, Lechitsky's army captured the lower reaches of the San, again creating the conditions for an attack on Krakow. For the hardest battles near Ivangorod and the defeat of the Austrian 1st Army, Lechitsky was awarded the 3rd degree Order of St. George, "for speeding up the army entrusted to him, crossing the Vistula River from Suliev to New Alexandria inclusively, which was broken "stubborn resistance of the enemy and at the same time captured over 200 officers, 15,000 lower ranks, 24 guns and 36 machine guns."

The next stage of the 9th Army's combat route was the Carpathian operation (January — April 1915). Given the shortage of shells, Lechitsky's main task was to organize defence and provide troops with rear supplies. To overcome the positional impasse, his army was entrusted with a complex operation to circumvent the Austrian defence and attack in Bukovina. During this operation, it was necessary to occupy Budapest, and then make a turn to the north and move to Krakow, knocking the enemy down successively from south to north. Fighting in the mountains is significantly different from action in the open field. Therefore, Lechitsky issued an order that said: "A frontal attack in the mountains leads to huge losses and still does not give a decisive result, why in all cases rounds should be used and sufficient forces." Thanks to this tactic, in the battles of 16–18 March near Khotyn, the 2nd and 3rd cavalry corps defeated the Austro-German army group Marshal, which allowed the 9th army to occupy part of the southern Carpathian passes.

A successful attack was prevented by the German Gorlitsky breakthrough, which forced the Russian Army to retreat. The victorious march of the German army of Mackensen was suspended by the cavalry of the 9th army, commanded by the legendary Count F.A. Keller. The cavalry broke through the defences of the Austrians and went to the Prut River, taking the cities of Snyatyn, Kolomyia, and Chernivtsi.

Nevertheless, the general rollback of the front continued. Against his background, the 9th Army showed great restraint. Having given the Austrians only the Chernivtsi region, the Army managed to keep its front. Moreover, by transferring reinforcements to neighbours, Lechitsky's army tried to hold down the enemy with constant counterattacks to prevent him from transferring his troops to other sectors of the front. During the attack of 19–24 May 1915 on the Prut River, the 30th Army Corps of Andrei Zayonchkovski took 1500 prisoners. This cause could be successfully developed, but the commander in chief of the armies of the front N.I. Ivanov, contrary to the arguments of Lechitsky, ordered to retreat to the Dniester.

During its four-month retreat, the 9th Army nevertheless took about 70000 prisoners, the award for which became the Order of the White Eagle with swords for Lechitsky. In mid-October, the location of the 9th Army was visited by Emperor Nicholas II.

In early March 1916, Lechitsky fell ill with lobar pneumonia. He was treated by Julius Osipovich Manasevich, the future personal doctor of General Brusilov. During the next detour of the front, Emperor Nicholas II visited the sick Lechitsky at the army headquarters in Kamenetz-Podolsk on 30 March 1916.

The 9th Army dealt an auxiliary strike in that operation, which was supposed to distract the enemy from the main direction. Platon Alekseevich was preparing his troops for a breakthrough with all care. He invented a special position - the "field commandant". He was obliged to constantly monitor battle areas so that no extra soul, be it scouts, observing officers, warrant officers and other persons, would be in the enemy's line of sight. Russian balloons and aeroplanes regularly flew around their positions, recording changes that could cause the Austrians to think about preparing an attack. In an atmosphere of strict secrecy, they managed to rebuild new bridgeheads at a distance of 100–150 meters from enemy defence lines. In many areas, the Austrians stretched the barbed wire to 70 rows, and in some places started a current on it, but a powerful and accurate artillery strike, coordinated with the infantry commanders to the smallest detail, helped break through the enemy's defences.

In 19 days, the 9th Army advanced 50 km, more than the neighbouring armies. In the battle of Dobronouck, it defeated the 7th Austro-Hungarian army. About 38000 soldiers, more than 750 officers and one general were captured by the Russians, with 60 guns and 170 machine guns captured as well. The Austrians lost 70000 men in battle. In addition, Lechitsky forced the German troops to leave, who were in a hurry to support the Allies.

On 18 June 1916, the 9th Army took the strongly fortified city of Chernivtsi, the unofficial capital of Bukovina. This was done contrary to the order of Brusilov, who demanded to turn to Galich and Stanislavov as quickly as possible. Lechitsky, however, understood that it was dangerous to leave an unfinished group and base in a large city on the left flank. Only after ending it, he moved his troops to Stanislavov and on 11 August took him.

The award to the legendary commander for his active participation in the Brusilovsky breakthrough was the Order of St. Alexander Nevsky with swords. In the same 1916, Emperor Nicholas II, on the proposal of the Protopresbyter of the military and naval clergy George Shchavelsky, awarded Lechitsky's father the Order of St. Vladimir of the 4th degree "in retribution of the merits of his son", and Archbishop Konstantin (Bulychev) of Mogilev and Mstislavsky with blessing of The Holy Synod elevated him to the rank of archpriest.

In the fall of 1916, the centre of gravity of the Southwestern Front moved south because Romania entered the war on the side of Russia. True, the Allies immediately proved to be a heavy burden for the Russian army - they were practically unworkable and immediately began to suffer heavy defeats from the Austro-Hungarians.

In this situation, P. A. Lechitsky held a front stretched for 320 kilometres for two months, reflecting the violent attacks of two enemy armies. His troops delayed the fall of Bucharest for a month. In the end, on 24 November 1916, a new front was created on this Romanian site, which included the 9th Army. Lechitsky did not become the commander-in-chief of this front as he did not speak the French language in which he was to communicate with the Romanian allies.

=== Fate after the revolution ===
After the February Revolution, without reconciling with the new order, he left the command of the army. He was promoted to the post of Assistant Commander-in-Chief of the Romanian Front instead of the resigned General Sakharov. On 7 May 1917, he retired. He resigned from the post of commander-in-chief of the armies of the Western Front.

On 3 December 1919, he was arrested for speculating in food, but the next day was released. On 1920 he joined the Red Army and in January 1921, he became the inspector of infantry and cavalry of the Petrograd Military District. In 1921, he was arrested and kept in the Taganskaya prison in Moscow, where he died of exhaustion on 18 February 1923.

According to other sources, he was arrested a second time on 8 March 1920, as the head of a counter-revolutionary military organization. He was sentenced to 2 years in prison and died on 2 February 1921, in the 1st Moscow prison hospital.

== Opinions and ratings ==
Marshal A.M. Vasilevsky in memoirs:

   The 9th Army was commanded by General P. A. Lechitsky, the only army commander at that time who did not leave the officers of the General Staff, that is, did not receive a higher military education. But then it was a military general: in the Russo-Japanese war, he commanded a regiment and was known in the army as an energetic military leader ...

   General Lechitsky was often in the army, and more than once I had to see him in different front-line situations. Unspoken, but rather agile, to me, a young officer, he seemed, however, somewhat decrepit.
   - MILITARY LITERATURE. Memoirs. Vasilevsky A.M. Life's work

From the memoirs of the former Minister of War of the Provisional Government and subsequently of the Soviet military leader A.I. Verkhovsky:

   ... A small, dry old man, all white, with a large white moustache, with a stubborn gaze of narrow, incredulously looking eyes, this general was distinguished by great honesty, military instinct, and caution. Moreover, in his way, he loved soldiers and studied and knew their positive and negative traits. All his activities were subject to the rule: measure seven times and only then cut off. And I must say that in the conditions in which the troops were located, with the clearly expressed reluctance of soldiers to fight, this was the only possible line.

   Lechitsky advanced during the Russo-Japanese War precisely with these qualities. He watched with great attention both the mood of the fighters and that they were full, dressed and shod. "A soldier without soles is not a soldier," Lechitsky liked to say, and he never required efforts from his units that were beyond their capabilities.

   There were few good commanders during the Russo-Japanese War. Lechitsky was noticed and appointed first as regiment commander, then division commander. If there was no war, he, having commanded a battalion, should have, like most army infantrymen, resigned. Regiments in the tsarist army were given to the guardsmen and officers of the General Staff, and only as an exception to ordinary army officers. But the war helped to reveal his non-shouting, but genuine military talent. What harmed him was a stern look from browed brows. It was not easy for them to discern in this little man a big, honest and full of love for people's hearts.
   - [MILITARY LITERATURE. Memoirs. Verkhovsky A.I. On the hard pass]

Publication in the newspaper "New Time" from 25 (12) March 1917:

   The old honoured warrior soldier General Lechitsky was appointed commander in chief instead of Evert. Lechitsky knows the whole Russian army. He earned himself a fighting name back in the Japanese company, and during the days of this war, he was the main participant in our attack on Galicia and the Carpathians, recaptured the Austrians from Lublin, invaded the enemy's borders, crossed Bukovina, and recently sat in the Forest Carpathians. Fate has more than once pushed me against General Lechitsky, I had to talk to him, observe him in a combat situation and was always struck by the unusual simplicity, directness and firmness of this man. The son of a village priest, who achieved everything without any patronage solely by his talents, General Lechitsky never turned a blind eye to our military shortcomings but firmly believed in a Russian soldier and the fate of Russia. In the days when they talked about the democratization of the army, and about the public rights of soldiers, when undeserved accusations are thrown at officers who are no different from soldiers in the war, it would be hard to find a better commander-in-chief. Strong will, determination, the ability to grasp the circumstances and conform to the situation, and the understanding of the soldier - these are the qualities that distinguish the new commander-in-chief. Commander-in-Chief Lechitsky is not so much a general as a soldier-soldier.

   AIK
   - [AND. IK. The new commander in chief gene. Lechitsky. New time from 25 (12) March 1917]

== Awards ==
- Order of Saint Stanislaus (House of Romanov), 3rd degree. (1887)
- Order of St. Anne of the 3rd Degree (1893)
- Order of Saint Stanislaus (House of Romanov), 2nd degree. (09/11/1895)
- Order of St. Anne of the 2nd degree (05/01/1900)
- swords for the Order of Saint Stanislaus (House of Romanov), 2nd degree. (1901)
- Order of St. Vladimir of the 4th degree with swords and bow (11.11.1903 - for the difference in cases against the Chinese)
- Golden Weapon for Bravery (12/9/1904 - for the difference in cases against the Japanese)
- Order of St. George 4th degree (02/13/1905)
- Order of St. Vladimir 3rd degree with swords (04/04/1905 - for the difference in cases against the Japanese)
- Order of Saint Stanislaus (House of Romanov), 1st degree with swords (08/15/1907 - for military distinctions)
- Order of St. Anne 1st Class (1911)
- Order of St. Vladimir, 2nd degree (1913)
- St. George's weapons with diamonds (09/29/1914 - for battles from 21 August – 10 September 1914)
- Order of St. George 3rd degree (10/22/1914 - for forcing the crossing of the Vistula River from Suliev to Novaya Aleksandr, entrusted to him by the army entrusted to him, which broke the stubborn resistance of the enemy and captured over 200 officers, 15,000 lower ranks, 24 guns and 38 machine guns). He was granted a visit by the Head of the Supreme Commander Emperor.
- Order of the White Eagle with swords (10/13/1915)
- Order of St. Alexander Nevsky with swords (07/06/1916)

=== Foreign orders ===
- Chinese Order of the Double Dragon, 3rd century 1st grade
- Grand Cross of the Order of the Crown of Romania
- large cross of the Order of the Star of Romania with swords (1917)

=== Medals ===
- Silver medal "For a trip to China" on the St. Andrew-Vladimir ribbon.
- Light-bronze medal "In memory of the Japanese war of 1904-1905" on the Alexander-George ribbon with a bow.
- Red Cross Medal "In Memory of the Russo-Japanese War" on the Alexander Ribbon.

== Literature ==
- A.I. K. The new commander of the gene. Lechitsky. // New time from 25 (12) March 1917.
- Avilov R. S. Military reforms in the Amur Military District on the eve of the First World War (1910 — summer 1914) // Russian collection. Research on the history of Russia. Vol. 19. M.: Modest Kolerov, 2016.S. 416–477. ISBN 978-5-905040-18-4
- Avilov R.S. The Amur Military District during the First World War: troops and defensive tasks. // Looking into the past. World wars of the 20th century in the history of the Russian Far East. Vladivostok: FEB RAS, 2015.S. 5-41. ISBN 978-5-91849-092-1 [1]
- Avilov, R. S.; Ayushin, N. B.; Kalinin, V. I. (2016). Vladivostok fortress: troops, fortification, events, people. Part III. "The fortress of three dimensions.". Vladivostok: Dalnauka. ISBN 978-5-8044-1584-7.
- Bazanov S. N. Non-shouting, but genuine military talent. // Military History Journal. 2016. No. 11. S. 54–58. ISSN 0321-0626
- Bondarenko V.V. Forgotten Heroes of the Great War. // Belarusian thought. 2013. No. 7. P.33-35.
- Verkhovsky A. I. On a difficult pass. - M .: Military Publishing, 1959. - 448 p. (Military memoirs) / Notes by S. S. Khesin.
- Lechitsky, Platon Alekseevich // Military Encyclopedia: [in 18 vol.] / Ed. V.F. Novitsky ... [and others]. - SPb.; [M.]: Type. t-va I. D. Sytin, 1911–1915.
- Zalessky K. A. Who was who in the First World War? - M .: AST; Astrel, 2003 .-- 896 p. - 5,000 copies. - ISBN 5-17-019670-9 (ACT); ISBN 5-271-06895-1 (Astrel).
- Oskin M.V. General Lechitsky - commander of the First World War. // Military History Journal. 2017. No. 1. S. 53–59. ISSN 0321-0626
- Fedorova E. Forgotten heroes of the Great War: Plato Lechitsky.

Preceded by Nikolai Kochanovsky	Commander of the 1st Siberian Rifle Regiment; 1901–1902	Succeeded by Sergei Khvastynov
Preceded by Anton Yegorovich von Saltza	Commander of the 1st Guards Infantry Division; 1906–1908	Succeeded by Iosif Mrozovsky
Preceded by Established	Commander of the 9th Army; 1914–1917	Succeeded by Gieorgij Stupin
