= 1st Siberian Rifle Regiment =

1st Siberian Rifle His Majesty's Regiment
- 1-й Сибирский стрелковый Его Величества полк
- Active: 1883–1918
- Country: Russian Empire
- Branch: Russian Imperial Army
- Role: Infantry
- Size: approx. 4,000
- Garrison/HQ: Razdol'noye, Primorskaya Oblast
- Patron: Nicholas II
- Anniversaries: November 26
- Engagements: Boxer Rebellion; Russo-Japanese War; World War I

The 1st Siberian Rifle His Majesty's Regiment (Russian: 1-й Сибирский стрелковый Его Величества полк) was an infantry regiment of the Russian Imperial Army, part of the 1st Siberian Rifle Division. Existing from 1883 until 1918, it was part of the Russian force in Manchuria during the Boxer Rebellion, then later fought in the Russo-Japanese War at the battles of Liaoyang and Mukden, before taking part in World War I.

== History ==
The unit was first formed on 30 October 1883 was the 1st East Siberian Rifle Battalion. On 11 May 1891 it was redesignated as the 1st East Siberian Rifle His Imperial Highness Tsarevich's Battalion (being named after Nicholas Alexandrovich, who was at the time the heir-apparent). On 2 November 1894 it was renamed the 1st East Siberian Rifle His Majesty's Battalion following the coronation of Nicholas II as the Emperor and Autocrat of All the Russias, and on 28 January 1898 it was reformed into a two-battalion infantry regiment. During the Boxer Rebellion in the Qing dynasty and the Russian intervention along with seven other powers, the 1st East Siberian Rifle Regiment was deployed into the three northeastern provinces of China (Manchuria) in 1900–1901. On 16 July 1900 it took part in fighting off attackers from the fortress-city of Kodzhou and on July 19 the regiment participated in storming it. Later, on September 11, it took part in combat near the city of old Nuchang. During the regiment's deployment in Manchuria at least twenty of its soldiers were decorated with the Decoration of the Military Order of St. George for distinguished service in the fighting at Kodzhou and Nuchang. The whole regiment was awarded with the head dress decoration with the label: "For Old Nuchang in 1900" (received on 19 February 1903).

A company of the regiment was removed from the unit and used for the formation of the 33rd East Siberian Rifle Regiment on 5 December 1903. From 1904 the 1st Siberian Rifle His Majesty's Regiment took part in the Russo-Japanese War as part of the 1st Brigade, 1st Siberian Rifle Division, 1st Siberian Army Corps. It fought in the Battle of Te-li-Ssu (14—15 June 1904), the Battle of Liaoyang (25 August—5 September 1904), and the Battle of Mukden (20 February—10 March 1905). After the losses at Te-li-Ssu some of the companies of the 1st Siberian Rifles only had about 150 to 160 fighting men left. It was upgraded with a third battalion on 2 February 1904 and later received another battalion on 11 October 1905. Two members of the regiment were awarded the Order of St. George, 4th class, for their service in the war against Japan. After the conflict the 1st Siberian Rifle Regiment was awarded with the St George's Banner with the label "For the battle of Mukden 21–26 February 1905" along with the silver cross of St. George with the label "For the battle of Liaoyang 17 and 18 August 1904", both on 26 November 1906.

At the outbreak of World War I in 1914 and throughout that conflict the regiment remained in the same division and army corps as it had in 1904–1905. It was assigned to different field armies, and in 1914 it was part of the Southwestern Front before it was transferred in August 1915 to become part of the Western Front. The 1st Siberian Rifles fought in the battles in Russian Poland near Warsaw around 1915. With the collapse of the Imperial Army due to the Russian Revolution in 1917–18 the regiment was demobilized.

It was officially headquartered in the village of Razdol'noye, in the Primorskaya Oblast.

== Organization ==
Siberian rifle regiments consisted of four battalions (approx. 1,000 men) of four companies (approx. 240 men) each, for a total wartime strength of about 4,000 men.

== Regimental rank insignia ==
=== Officers ===
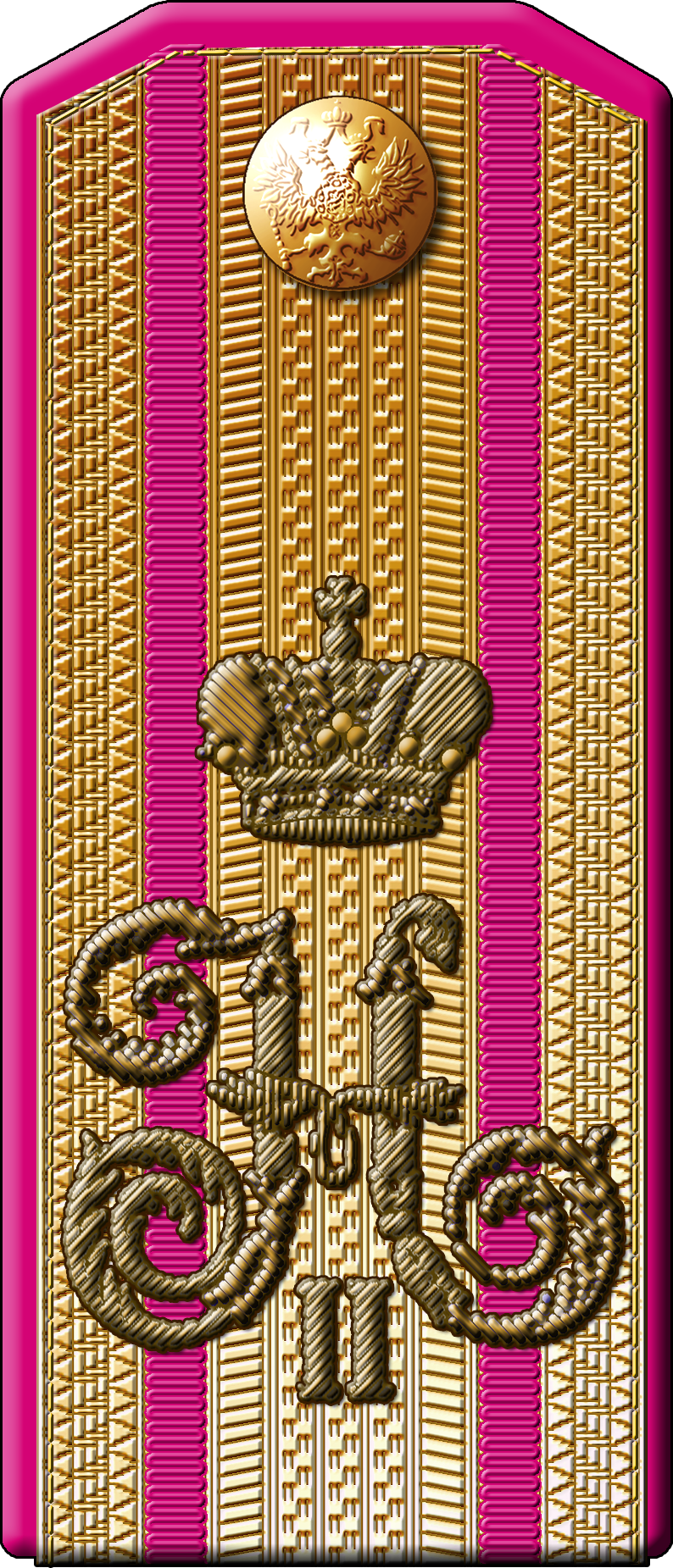
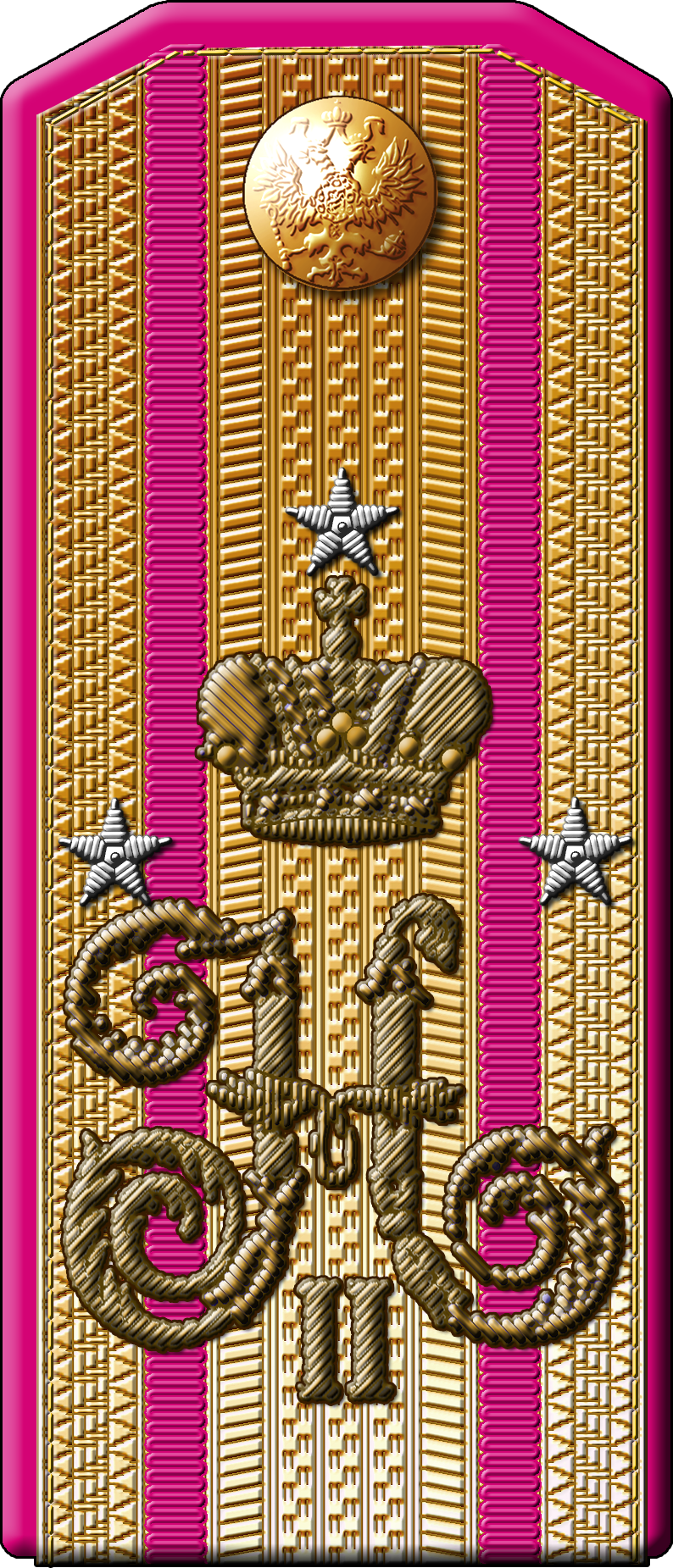
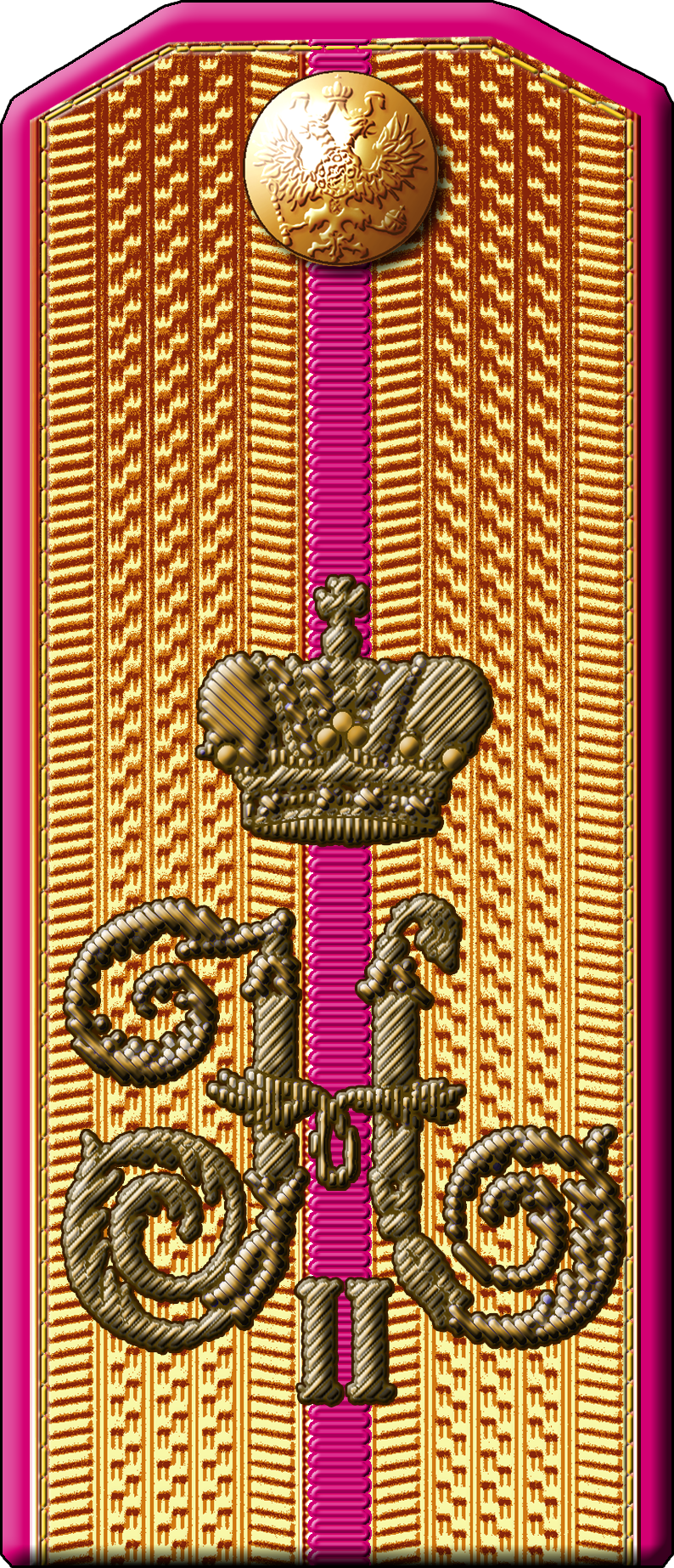
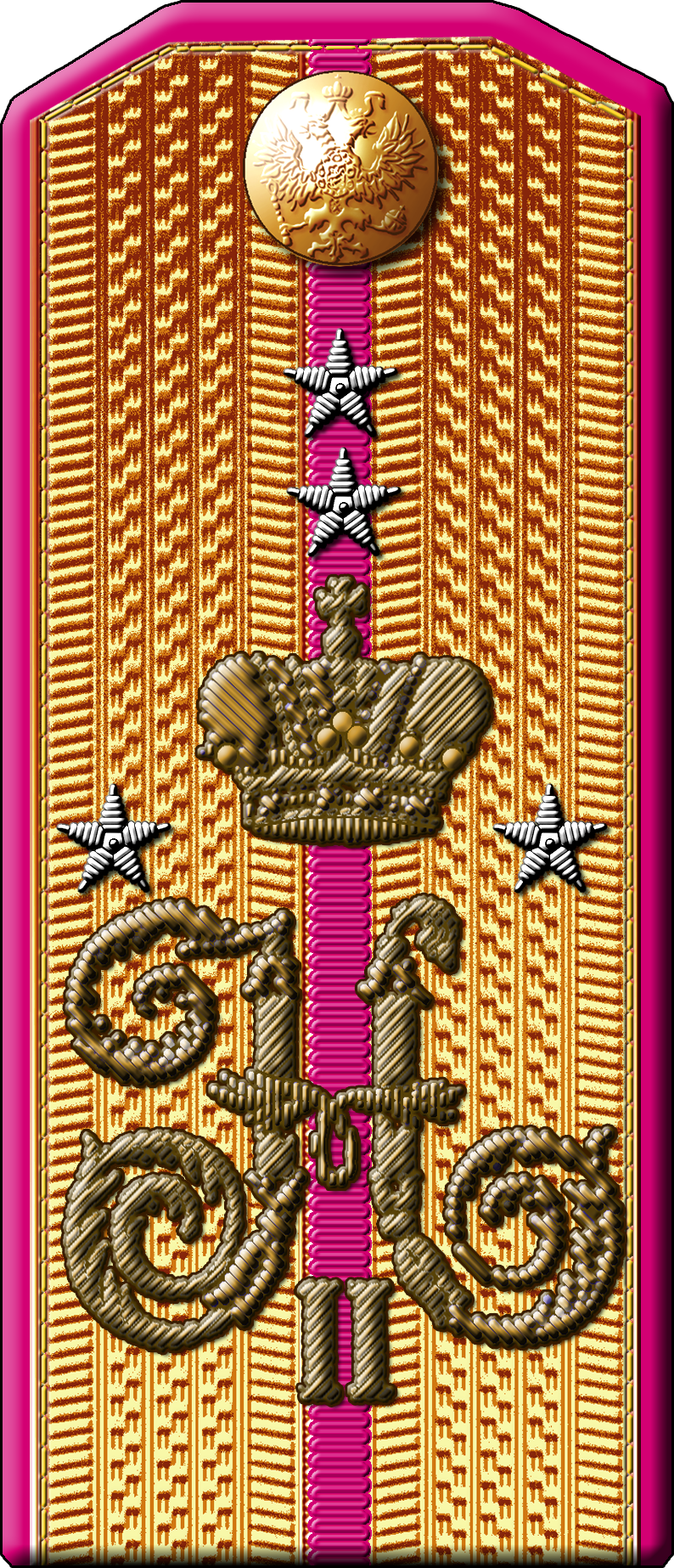
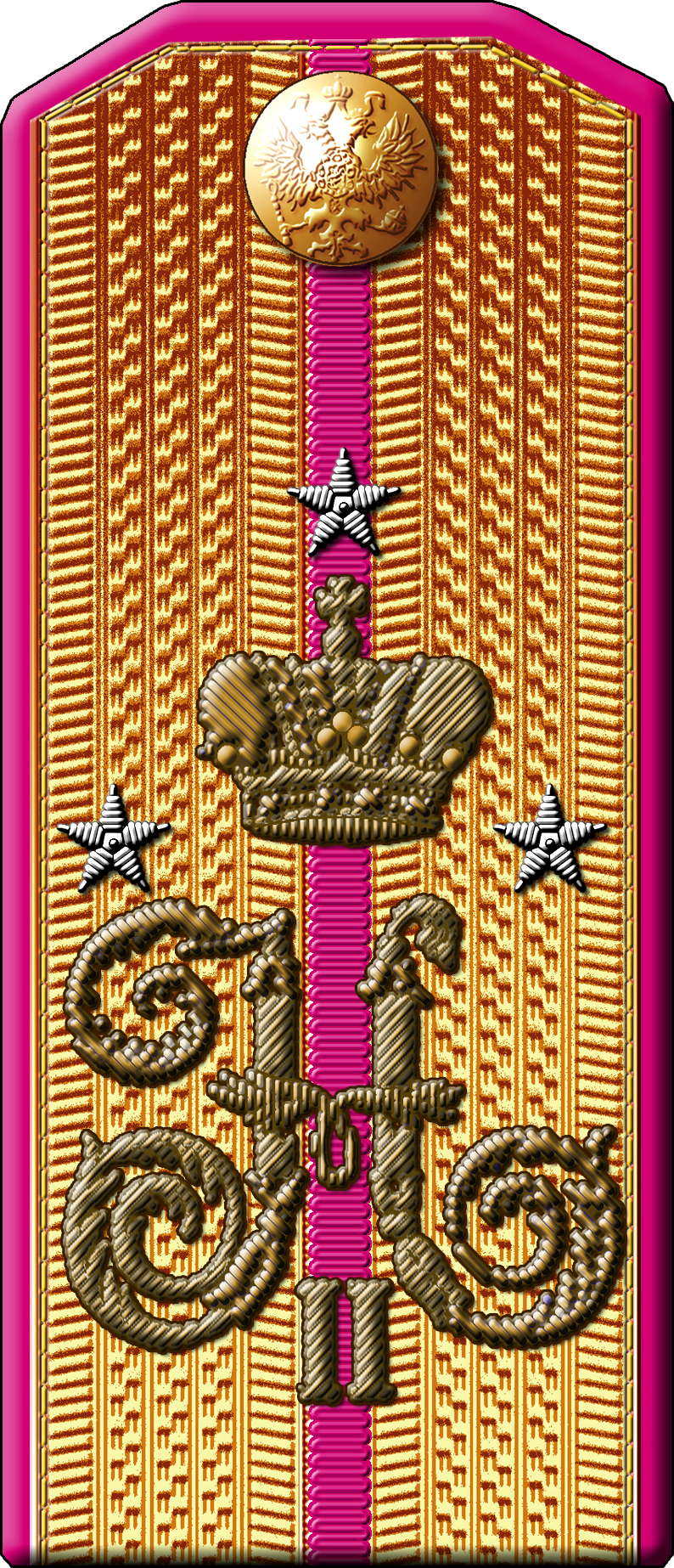
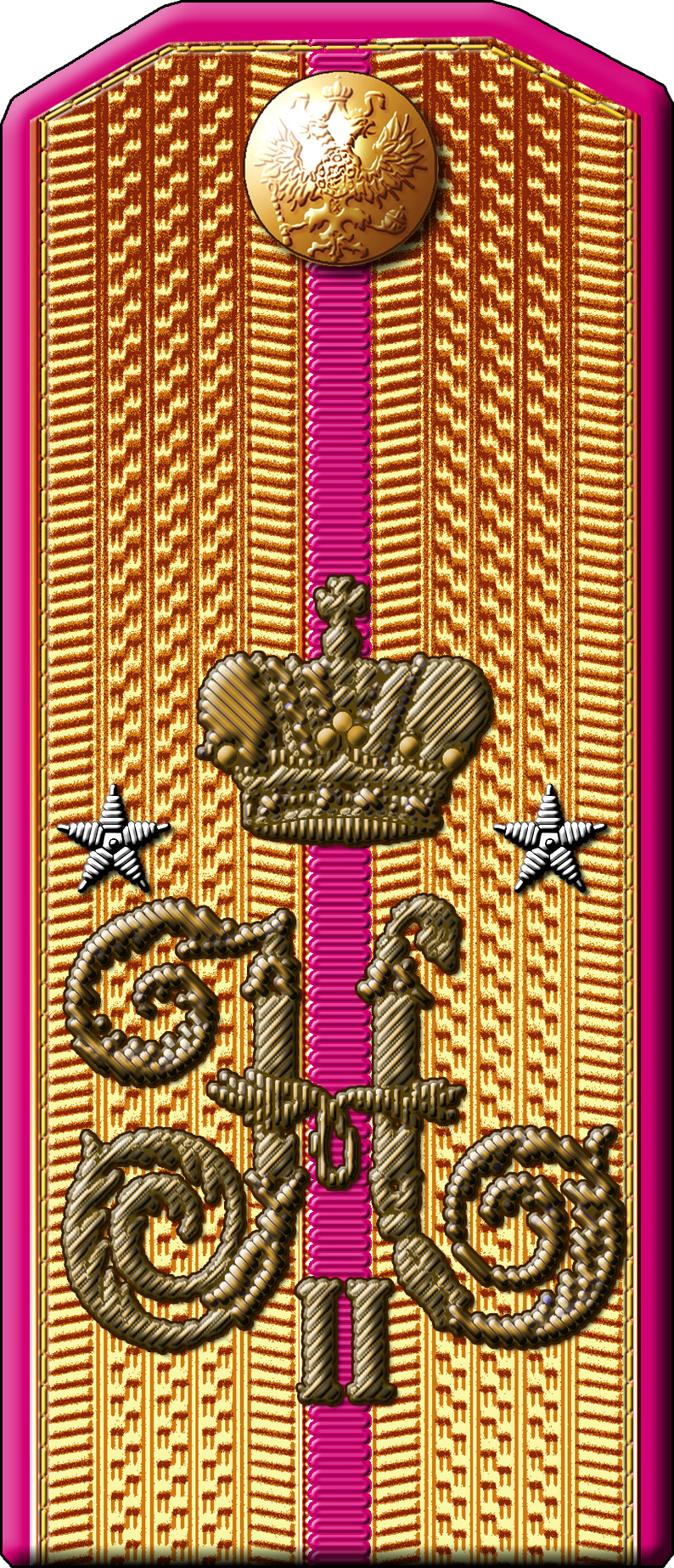
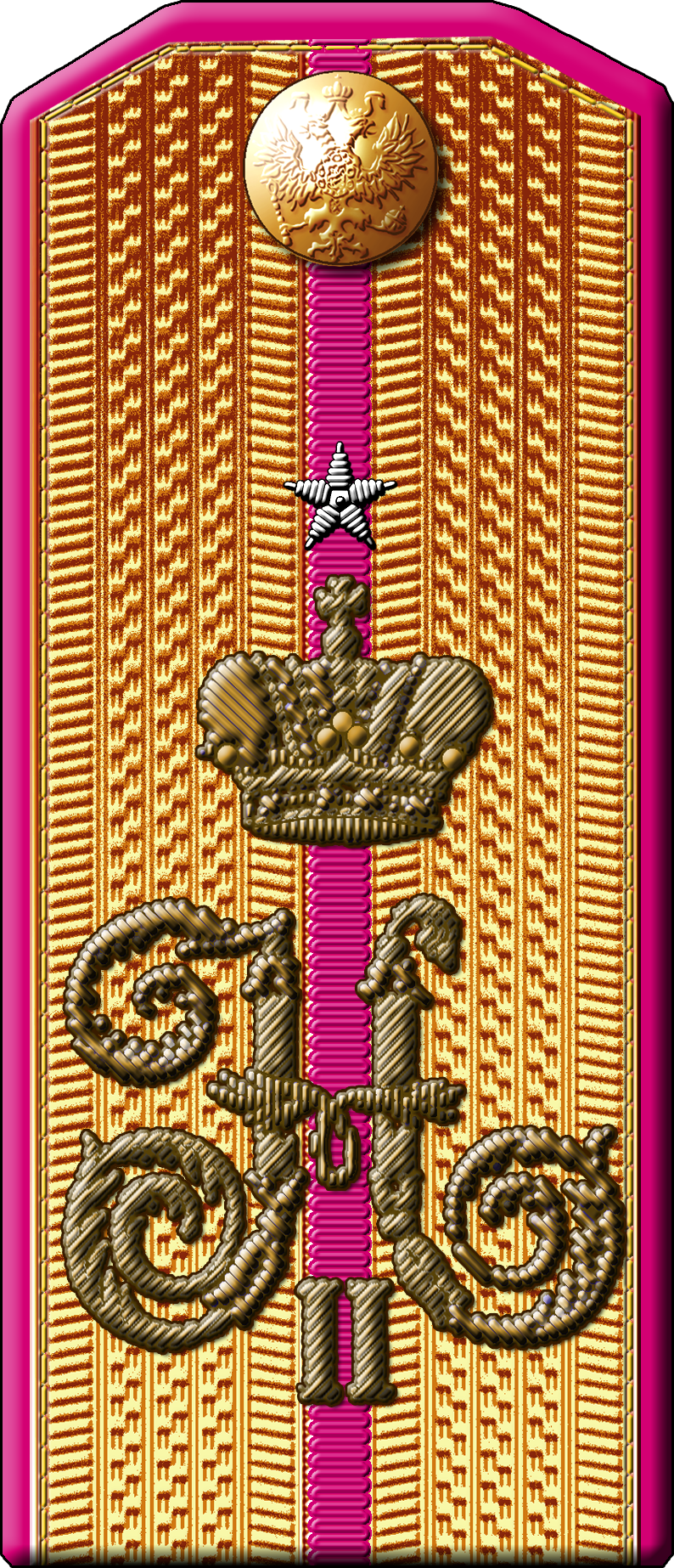
Label	Rank insignia as of 1904–1909
Shoulder boards
Rank	Colonel	Lieutenant colonel	Captain	Staff captain	Ensign	Junior ensign	Warrant officer
Group	Staff officers		Junior officers

=== NCOs and enlisted ===
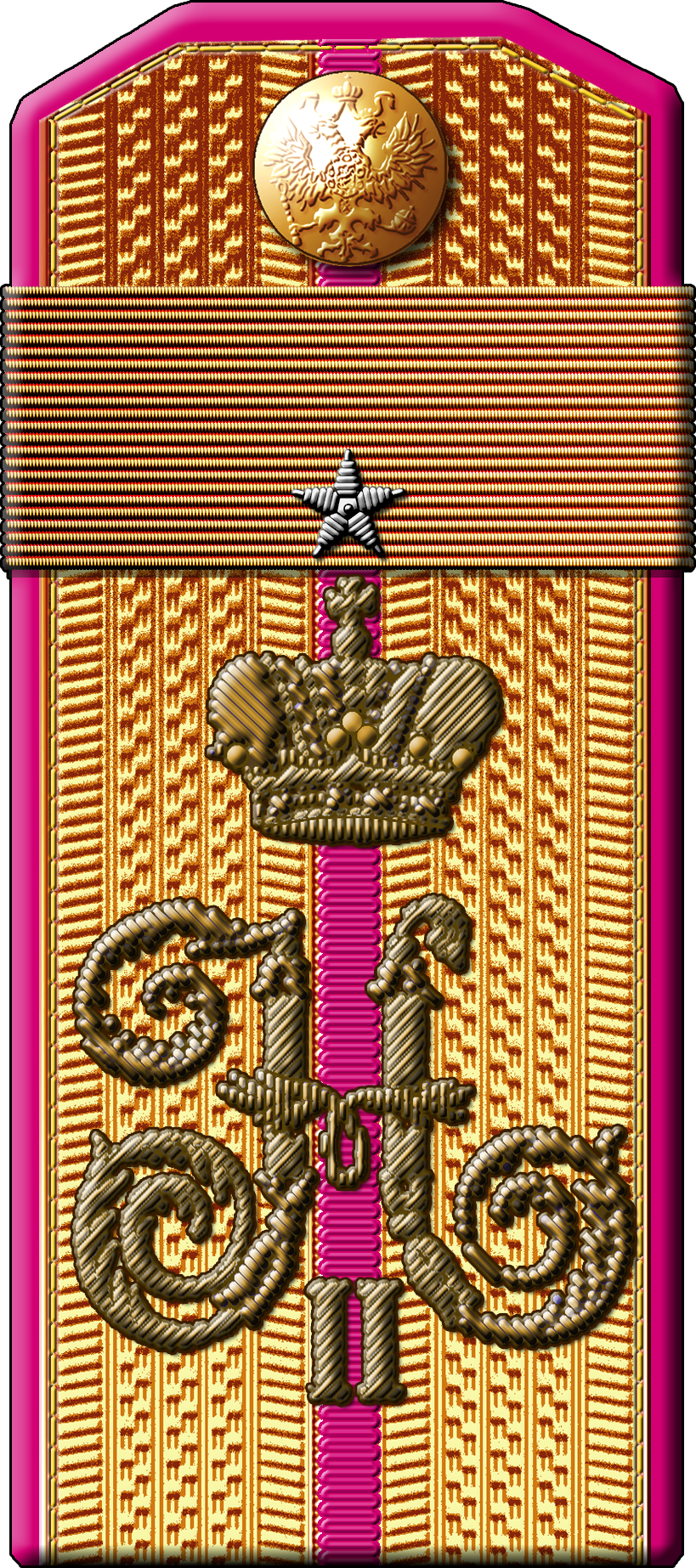
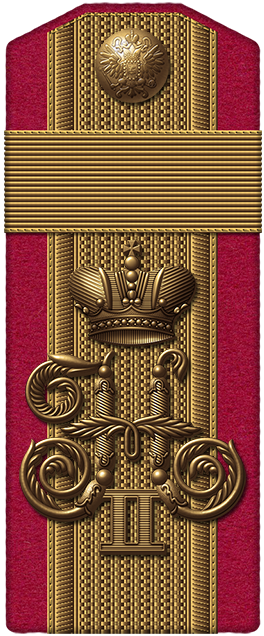
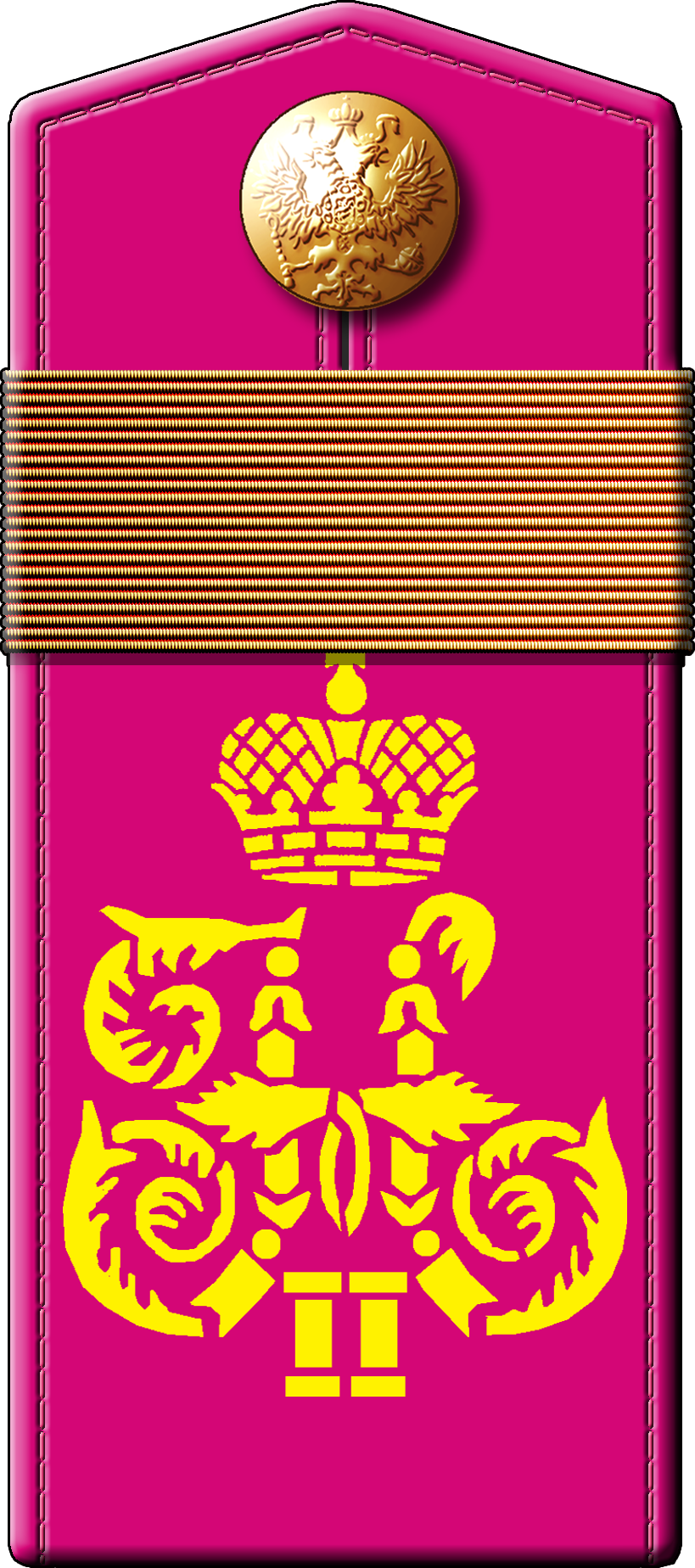
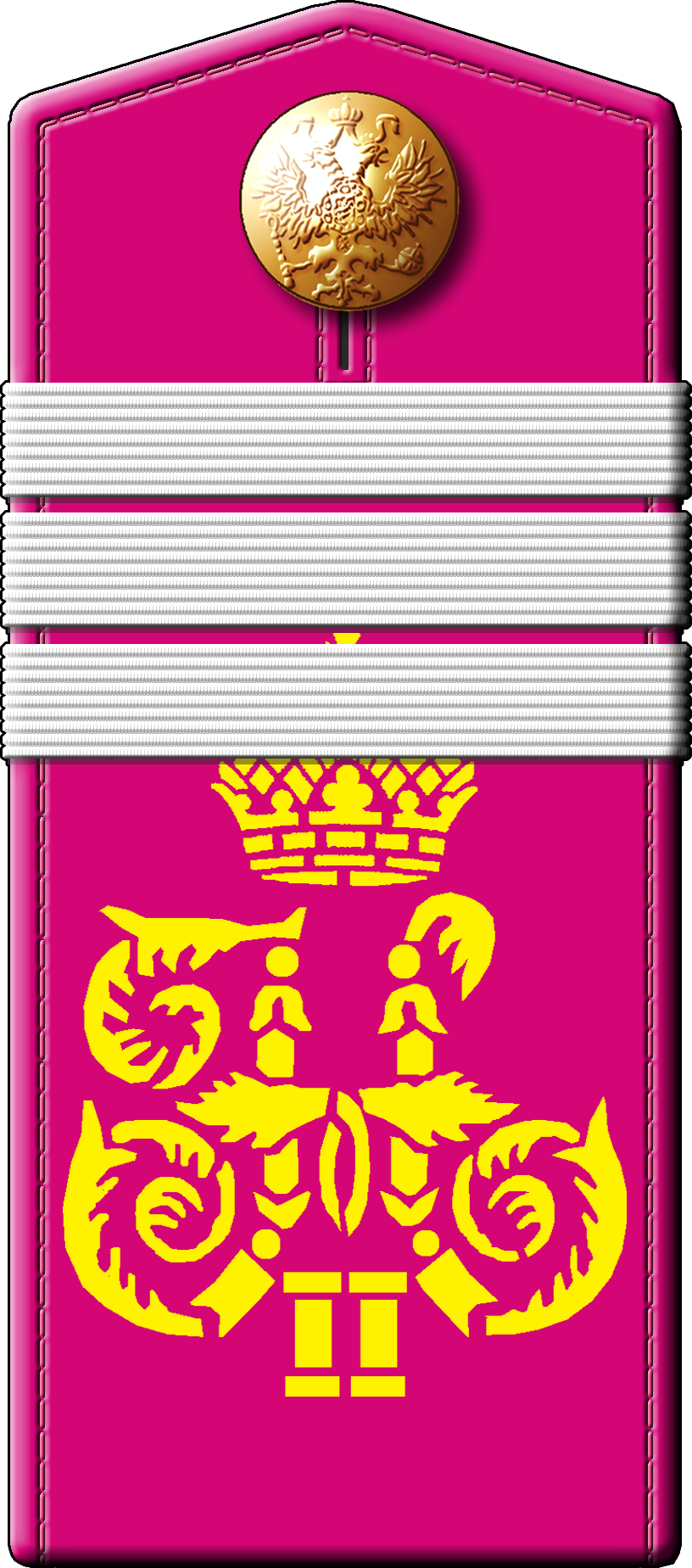
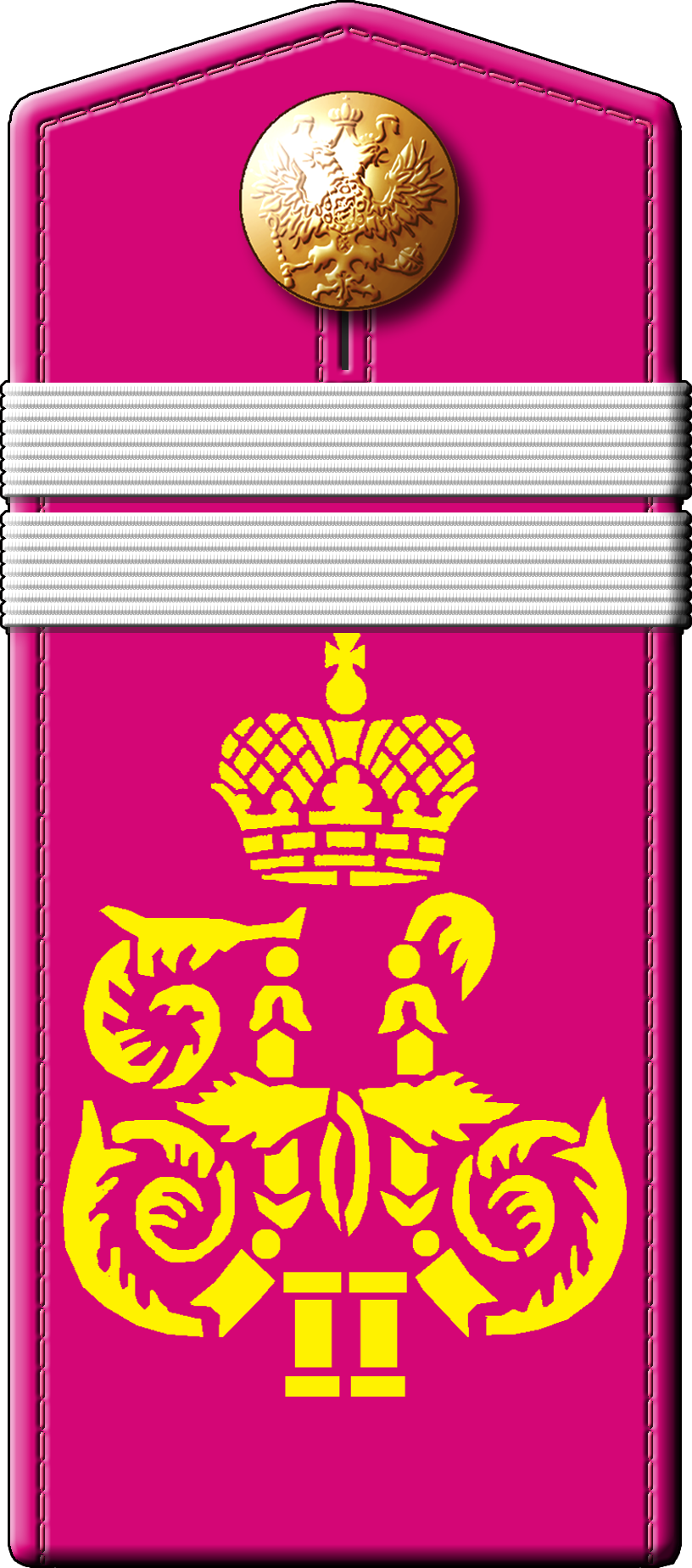
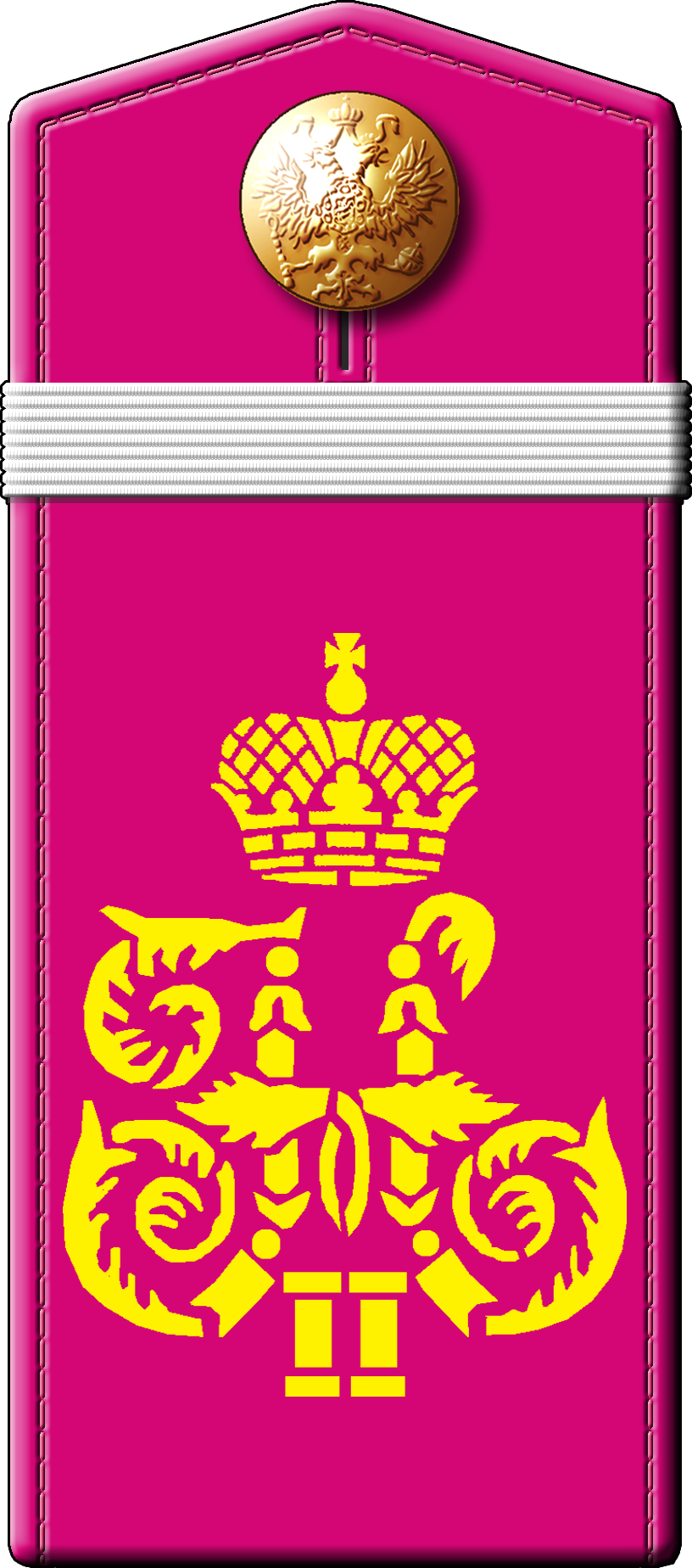
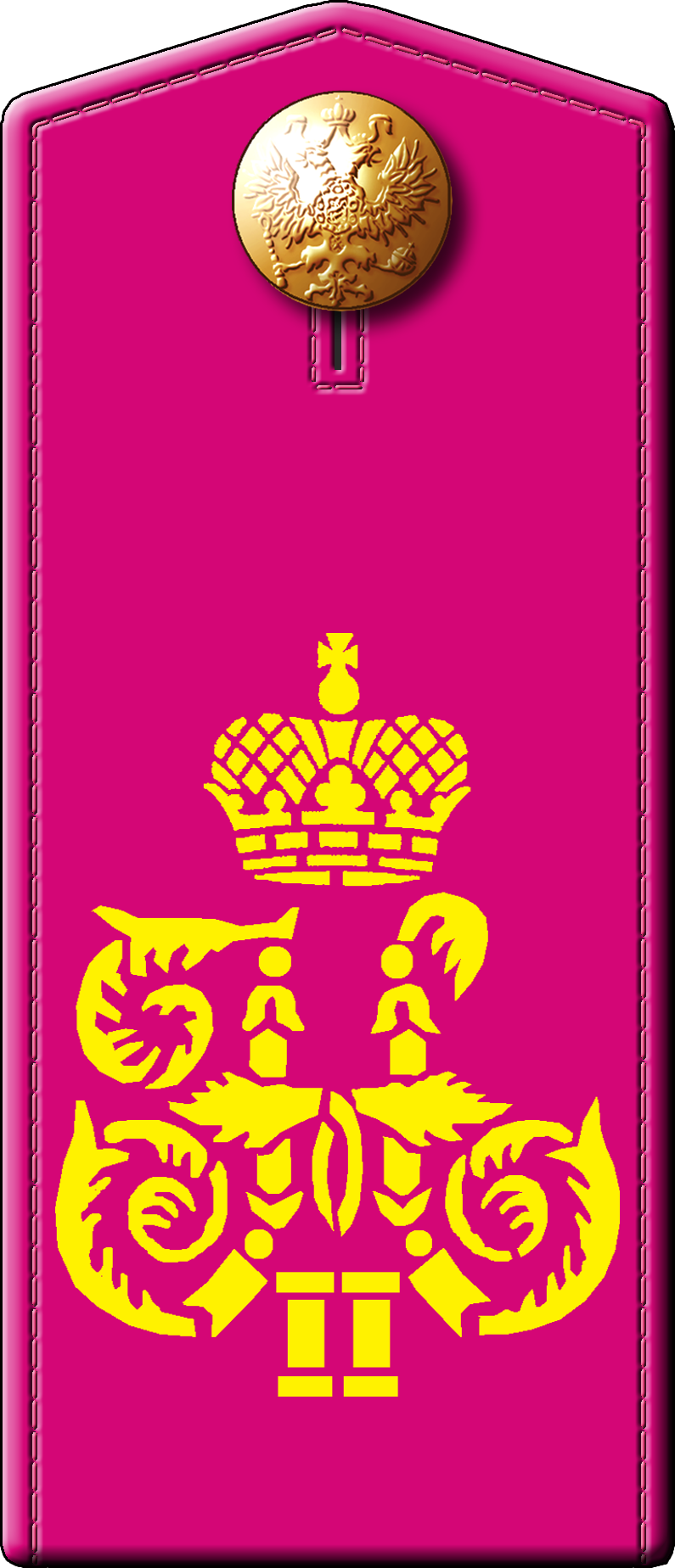
Label	Rank insignia as of 1904–1909 and 1914
Shoulder boards
Rank	Deputy warrant officer from feldwebels	Junior warrant officer in the role of feldwebel (1914)	Feldwebel	Senior sergeant	Junior sergeant	Corporal	Private
Группа	NCOs					Privates

=== Other rank insignia ===
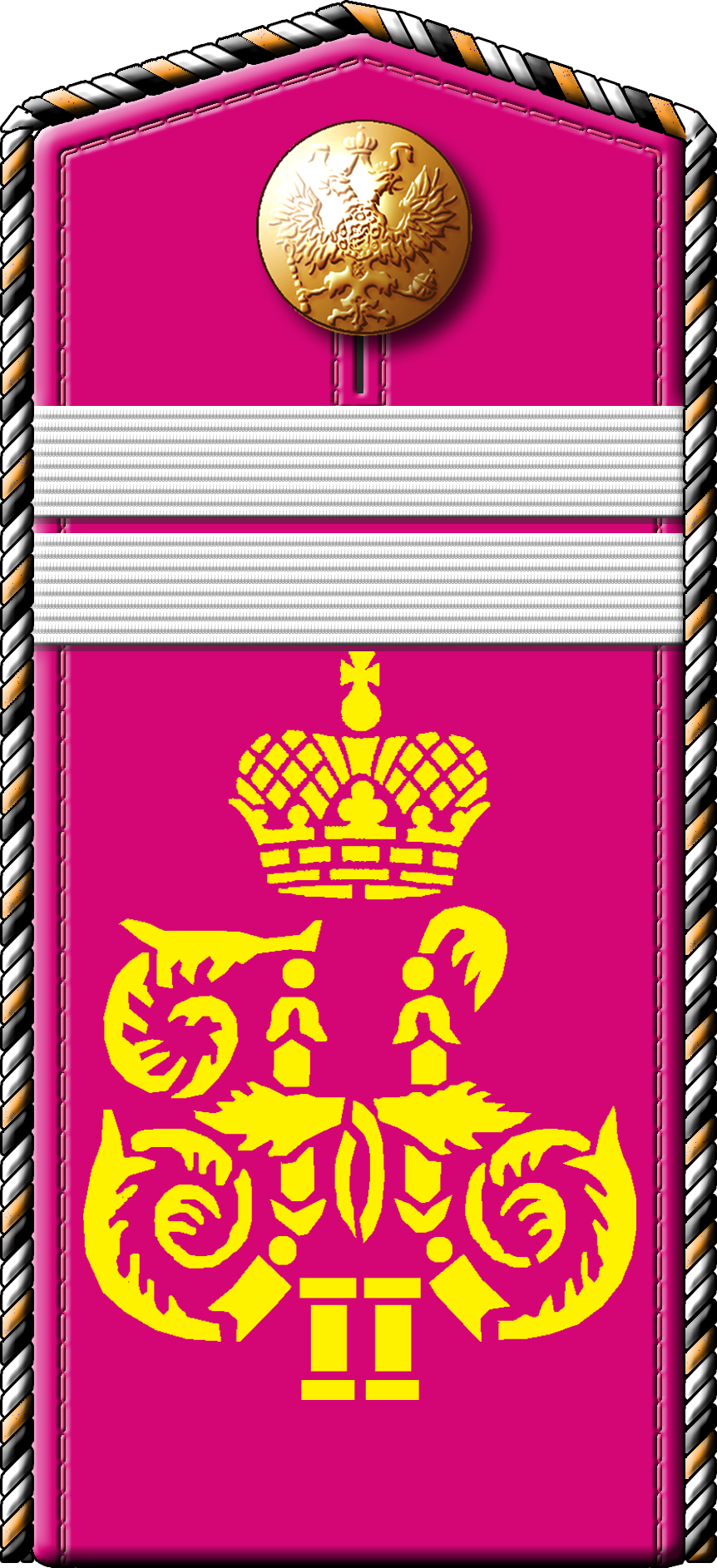
Military rank insignia
(1904-1909)
Junior sergeant
in the role of a volunteer

== Known commanders ==
This is the list of known regimental commanders, the information is not complete.

From	Commander	Until
1 November 1895	Colonel Nikolai Kochanovsky	2 October 1896
1 September 1901	Colonel Platon Lechitsky	23 April 1902
1 July 1903	Colonel Sergei Khvastynov	?
5 May 1904	Colonel Leonid Lesh	7 September 1905
1905	Colonel Sergei Andreyev	27 July 1907
27 December 1906	Colonel Mikhail Kvetsinsky	6 July 1910
1 January 1909	Staff Captain Yakov Abramovitch Kolesnikov	?
4 August 1910	Colonel Yakov Lyubitsky	?
