= 1st Siberian Army Corps =

- Active: May 1900 – Aug 1918
- Country: Russian Empire
- Branch: Russian Imperial Army
- Type: Infantry
- Role: Corps
- Engagements: Russo-Japanese War: Battle of Telissu; Battle of Tashihchiao; Battle of Liaoyang; Battle of Sandepu; Battle of Mukden; World War I: Battle of Łódź (1914); Battle of Galați

The 1st Siberian Army Corps was an elite unit of the Imperial Russian Army. It was raised in May 1900 and disbanded in August 1918.

== History ==
The 1st Siberian Army Corps was raised in May 1900 under the command of Lieutenant General Nikolai Linevich and was one of the two most engaged Russian corps during the Russo-Japanese War. It took part in the battle of Telissu, the battle of Tashihchiao, the battle of Liaoyang, the battle of Sandepu and the battle of Mukden.

It also took part in World War I. Its last major action was at the Battle of Galați.

== Organization ==
=== 1904 ===
- 1st Siberian Rifle Division (Lieutenant General Gerngross)
  - 1st Brigade (Major General Rutowski)
    - 1st Infantry Regiment (3 battalions)
    - 2nd Infantry Regiment (3 battalions)
  - 2nd Brigade (Major General Maximovich)
    - 3rd Infantry Regiment (3 battalions)
    - 4th Infantry Regiment (3 battalions)
  - 1st East Siberian Rifle Artillery Brigade (Major General Lutshkovski)
    - 4 Field Artillery Batteries (6 guns each)
- 9th Siberian Rifle Division (Major General Kondratovich)
  - 1st Brigade (Major General Krause)
    - 33rd Infantry Regiment (3 battalions)
    - 34th Infantry Regiment (3 battalions)
  - 2nd Brigade (Major General Sykow)
    - 35th Infantry Regiment (3 battalions)
    - 36th Infantry Regiment (3 battalions)
  - 9th East Siberian Rifle Artillery Brigade (Major General Mrosovski)
    - 4 Field Artillery Batteries (6 guns each)
    - 1 Machinegun Company
- Ussuri Cavalry Brigade
  - Frontier Guard Cavalry Regiment (4 Sotnias)
  - Frontier Guard Battery (4 Chinese Mountain Guns)
  - Primorsk Dragoon Regiment
  - 2nd Transbaikal Cossack Battery
  - 1st East Siberian Sapper Battalion

=== 1914 ===
- 1st Siberian Rifle Division
- 2nd Siberian Rifle Division
- Ussuri Cavalry Brigade
- 1st Siberian Artillery Battalion
- 2nd Siberian Heavy Artillery Battalion
- 1st Siberian Ponton Battalion
- 1st Siberian Radio Battalion

== List of Commanding officers ==
	Name	From	To
1	Lieutenant General Nikolai Linevich	May 1900	July 1903
2	Lieutenant General Vladimir Viktorovich Sakharov	November 1903	April 1904
3	Lieutenant General Georgii Stackelberg	April 1904	March 1905
4	Lieutenant General Aleksandr Gerngross	May 1905	June 1910
5	Lieutenant General Yakov Schkinsky	June 1910	April 1911
6	Lieutenant General Arkady Nikanorovich Nishenkov	April 1911	May 1912
7	Lieutenant General Mikhail Mikhailovich Pleshkov	May 1912	July 1916
8	Lieutenant General Eugene A. Iskritsky	July 1916	1918
