= 1st Siberian Rifle Artillery Brigade =

- 1-я Сибирская стрелковая артиллерийская бригада
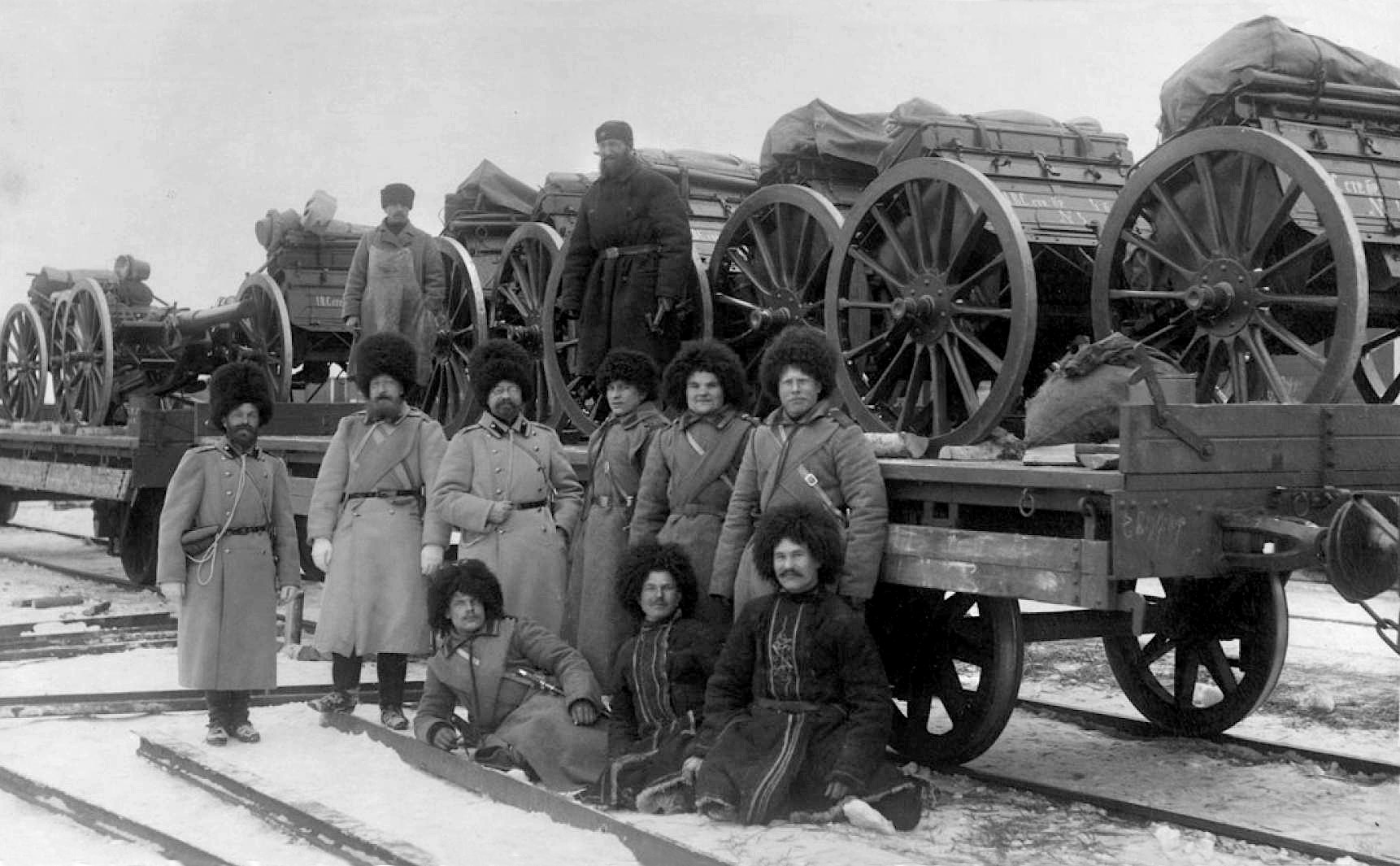
- 4th battery of the brigade departing for the war against Japan, February 1904
- Active: 1851—1918
- Country: Russian Empire
- Branch: Russian Imperial Army
- Role: Artillery
- Garrison/HQ: Nikolsk-Ussuriski, Primorskaya Oblast
- Engagements: Boxer Rebellion; Russo-Japanese War; World War I

The 1st Siberian Rifle Artillery Brigade (Russian: 1-я Сибирская стрелковая артиллерийская бригада) was an artillery brigade of the Russian Imperial Army attached to the 1st Siberian Rifle Division of the 1st Siberian Army Corps. The unit was founded in 1851 and took part in the Russian intervention in the Boxer Rebellion, the Russo-Japanese War, and World War I before being demobilized in 1918 following the Russian Revolution.

== History ==
The unit's origins dated back to 15 June 1851 with the formation of the 16th Garrison Artillery Brigade, consisting of troops located in Siberia. On 29 January 1857, it became the Line Transbaikal Artillery Brigade (Russian: Линейная Забайкальская Артиллерийская бригада). On 29 March 1869, it was renamed to the East Siberian Artillery Brigade, with its headquarters located in Blagoveshchensk. Its 1st battery was based in Verkhneudinsk and its mountain battery in Vladivostok. In 1884 the East Siberian Military District was divided and the East Siberian Artillery Brigade became part of the Amur Military District. Until 1889 the brigade was located in Nikolskoye, where it remained until 1899, being moved to Nikolsk-Ussuriski. After 31 July 1895, it became known as the 1st East Siberian Artillery Brigade. A new 1st battery of the brigade was formed on 1 March 1900 and the formation was deployed to the Kwantung Oblast. On 13 May 1900, it became part of the newly formed Siberian Army Corps. That year, it also took part in the Eight Nation Alliance intervention in the Boxer Rebellion that occurred in Qing China.

=== Russo-Japanese War ===
On 12 February 1901, the 1st East Siberian Artillery Brigade was subordinated to the 1st Siberian Army Corps. With the beginning of hostilities during the Russo-Japanese War, the brigade (at the time consisting of four batteries) became part of the Russian Manchurian Army in 1904. Later that year, on 15 February, it was renamed the 1st East Siberian Rifle Artillery Brigade. Around this time the 2nd battery formerly of the 23rd Artillery Brigade became part of the unit. The brigade, along with its corps, later became part of the 1st Manchurian Army. In the war against Japan it took part in the Battle of Te-li-Ssu (14–15 June 1904) and in the Battle of Mukden (20 February–10 March 1905). At least one officer of the brigade was awarded the Order of St. George during the war. On 19 February 1906m it was transferred to peacetime status and remained as part of the 1st Siberian Army Corps. In 1907, it was reformed, with the batteries being organized into two divisions of three batteries each. In September 1910, the unit was renamed the 1st Siberian Rifle Artillery Brigade and was made part of the 1st Siberian Rifle Division. In addition, it received the former East Siberian mountain artillery division.

=== World War I ===
As part of the general mobilization of the Russian Imperial Army in August 1914, the 1st Siberian Rifle Artillery was transferred to the Kazan Military District. In September, its parent corps, the 1st Siberian Army Corps, became part of the 5th Army on the Southwestern Front. In November 1914, the brigade had become part of the 2nd Army. From June 1915 the brigade was part of the 1st Army and in August of that year it was returned to the 2nd Army as part of the Western Front. Towards the end of 1916, it was transferred to the 10th Army, where it would remain until the end of the war, and on 23 April 1917 a new light artillery battery was formed within the brigade. With the upheaval of the Russian Revolution in 1917–1918 and the subsequent collapse of the Russian army, the 1st Siberian Rifle Artillery Brigade was demobilized.

== Organization ==
For the duration of its existence, the 1st Siberian Rifle Artillery Brigade was part of the 1st Siberian Rifle Division (since 1910) of the 1st Siberian Army Corps (since 1900). As of 1901, the brigade consisted of the following (the date of each unit's establishment is given):

- 1st battery (1900)
- 2nd battery (1883)
- 3rd battery (1869)
- 4th battery (1892)
- 5th battery (1889)
- 6th battery (1889)
- 7th mountain battery (1896)
- 8th mountain battery (1896)

By 1907 it was reduced to a strength of six batteries, and divided into two artillery battalions.

- 1st battalion
  - 1st battery
  - 2nd battery
  - 3rd battery
- 2nd battalion
  - 4th battery
  - 5th battery
  - 6th battery

In 1910 the brigade received its mountain artillery again:

- 1st battalion
  - 1st battery
  - 2nd battery
  - 3rd battery
- 2nd battalion
  - 4th battery
  - 5th battery
  - 6th battery
- 3rd battalion
  - 7th mountain battery
  - 8th mountain battery

== Known commanders ==
This is not a complete list.

- 1904: Major General Luchkovsky
- 1906—1909: Major General Alexander Ovyany
- 1909–1910: Major General Valentin Mokhov
- 1910–?: Major General Nikolai Mikhailov
- 1915–1917: Major General Vladimir Bodisko
