= Dniester Front =

1915 German offensive on the Eastern Front of World War I

Zolota Lypa – Dniestr battle
- Part of the Eastern Front of World War I
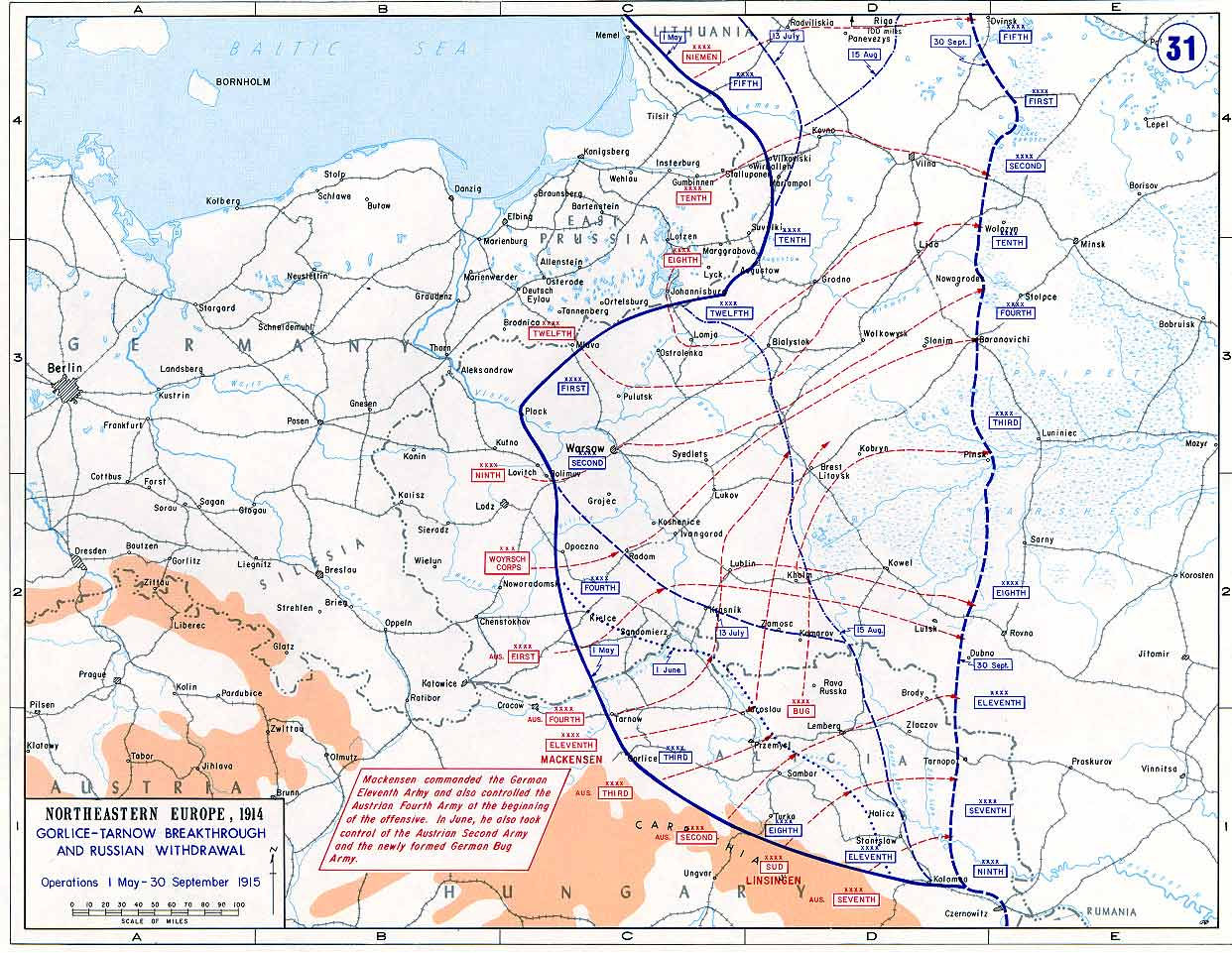
- Zolota Lypa-Dnestr battle
Date	14 July – 31 August 1915
Location	Zolota Lypa and Dniester (present-day Poland and Western Ukraine)
Result	Indecisive: part of Great Retreat

Belligerents
German Empire; Austria-Hungary	Russian Empire

Commanders and leaders
(Austria-Hungary) Karl von Pflanzer-Baltin	(Russian Empire) Platon Lechitsky

Units involved
(German Empire) South Army (Austria-Hungary) VII Army	(Russian Empire) IX Army (Russian Empire) XI Army

Strength
On 28 July 1915; Total: 345,360; 563 guns 471 machine guns	On 28 July 1915; Total: 400,716 men 771 guns 616 machine guns

Casualties and losses
Total: 30,525 men 5,162 KIA; 17,756 WIA; 7,607 MIA	Total 34,230 men 5,010 KIA; 20,789 WIA; 8,431 MIA

Inconclusive battle between the armies of Austria-Hungary and the Russian Empire during the summer offensive of the Central Powers in 1915.

== Background ==
The Austro-Hungarian armies of the Northern Front, not included in the army group of A. von Mackensen, received passive tasks of pinning down the opposing Russian forces and gradually liberating the territory of eastern Galicia from the Russian troops by attacking Buchach and Chortkiv. Since the left tributaries of the Dniester were natural defensive lines, the commander of the 7th Austro-Hungarian Army, cavalry general Karl von Pflanzer-Baltin, decided to force the Dniester River between the mouths of the Strypa and Secret rivers.

== Battle ==
The main blow was dealt by the 3rd Corps; cavalry group Z. von Benin (up to 9,600 horsemen) was supposed to go to the rear of the Russian 9th army to Khotyn and Kamenetz-Podolsk, but beforehand the 6th infantry division crossed the Dniester and broke through the Russian positions. For the offensive on Buchach, the 13th Corps stood out, striking at the mouth of the Zolota Lipa River. The German South Army joined the operation two days later, covering the left flank of the 7th Army with the reinforced corps of G. Hoffmann.

On the night of July 14, Austro-Hungarian troops crossed the Dniester River and pressed the Russian bridgehead at Chernelytsia (on the right bank). There was a threat that the Austro-Hungarians would go to the rear of the 33rd Army Corps of the Russian 9th Army near Tluste. All day the Russian troops waged counterattacks, which ended in success in a number of places. But on the morning of July 15, the Austro-Hungarians again struck at the 2nd Cavalry and 33rd Army Corps and advanced to the east. Against the 30th Army Corps, the Austro-Hungarian troops crossed to the eastern bank of the Zolota Lypa. To restore the situation, P. Lechitsky ordered the 9th Army on July 16 to launch a counterattack, striking not only at the groups that had broken through to the left bank of the Dniester, but also with the forces of the 32nd Army and 3rd Cavalry Corps - on the right flank 7th Austro-Hungarian Army.

On July 16–17, the operation acquired the character of oncoming battles. K. von Pflanzer-Baltin refused to strike with the 3rd corps and transferred its reserves to the group Siegmund von Benigni in Müldenberg; to support the 13th corps on the Zolota Lypa River, P. Hoffmann's corps and the 48th reserve division of the German Southern Army went on the offensive. Alois Schönburg-Hartenstein's group, advancing north along the left bank of the Seret River, was met by a Russian blow and thrown back to Duninov, but, reinforced by the 3rd Cavalry Division, stopped the further advance of the Russian troops. Russian troops captured more than 1,500 prisoners and 3 machine guns, but they failed to completely throw the troops of the Central Powers into the Dniester. The offensive near the Dobronoutsy village was not successful, but the Austro-Hungarian troops in the bridgeheads captured east of the Zolota-Lypa and Dniester rivers were bled, and their commanders demanded a withdrawal to their original positions.

On the night of July 18, P. Hofmann's group struck to support the left flank of the 13th Corps on the Zolota Lypa River, but in time it coincided with the start of the attack of the Russian 11th Army Corps against the enemy's 1st Cavalry Division. The stubborn battle did not bring success to either side.

The Russian bridgehead near the village Tolstobaby was liquidated, but the troops of Hofmann and Ignaz von Korda were withdrawn from the eastern bank of the river and went on the defensive. Stubborn battles were fought until the morning of July 20 and also ended in vain. Opponents entrenched in captured or held positions. The cavalry breakthrough, planned by Karl von Pflanzer-Baltin, was thwarted by the active actions of the army of Platon Lechitsky. The only achievement of the 7th Army was the bridgeheads on the eastern bank of the Dniester. However, their retention required more forces than the initial positions on the right bank. The Russian troops, having imposed oncoming battles on the enemy, prevented the development of a breakthrough and captured 8 machine guns and 1,827 prisoners during the entire battle.

The established calm allowed the Russian Supreme Commander to use the armies of the Southwestern Front to strengthen the group from Riga to Białystok. On July 25, the 2nd Finnish Rifle and 69th Infantry Divisions were allocated to be sent to the armies of the Northwestern Front. On July 29, the 1st Kuban Cossack Division was sent from the 11th Army. On July 31, Grand Duke Nikolai Nikolayevich ordered, despite the protests of N. Ivanov, to allocate 120 companies from the divisions of the South-Western Front to replenish the armies of the North-Western Front. On August 8, the order to send the 65th Infantry and 4th Finnish Rifle Divisions followed.

Having apparently received information about a significant weakening of the armies of the Russian Southwestern Front, Karl von Pflanzer-Baltin resumed active operations without affecting the noticeably reduced 11th Army. The blow was directed at the bridgehead of the 9th Army on the right bank of the Dniester River near Chernelytsia. On August 8, the 22nd Landwehr Infantry Division from the 3rd Corps launched a diversionary attack on the 33rd Army Corps, which unexpectedly led to a breakthrough between the 33rd and 30th Army Corps. The 28th Infantry Division broke through the positions of the Russian 80th Infantry Division. On the night of August 9, the 71st and 80th Russian divisions carried out several counterattacks, recaptured part of the trenches near the Ostra village . But in the morning, the Austro-Hungarians resumed their offensive and pushed back the Russian 30th Army Corps to the left bank. 2,760 Russian soldiers were captured.

Commander-in-Chief of the Southwestern Front N. Ivanov ordered the 11th Army to assist the 8th Army at Sokal and the 9th Army at Zolota Lypa, but its commander Dmitry Shcherbachev resolutely stated that he was unable to fulfill the order about the offensive, since the army is exhausted by the withdrawal of the best divisions from it. Active actions were also difficult due to natural conditions: because of the rains, the Zlota-Lipa River overflowed. The attacks of the Austro-Hungarians on the last shred of the Chernelytsia bridgehead on August 10–11 were successfully repelled, and on August 12 an order was issued to send the 3rd Corps to the Italian front. After such a significant weakening, the enemy also went on the defensive.

In August, the armies of the Southwestern Front were once again weakened by the allocation of the 28th Army Corps to the Northwestern Front from August 20. Since the troops were taken from the 8th Army, the right flank of which was covered by the enemy, the 30th and 32nd Army Corps from the 9th Army and the 105th Infantry Division from the 11th Army were transferred to its place. In total, 10 divisions were sent to the army of the North-Western Front in 5 weeks, which greatly facilitated the situation on the Narew and Neman. Such large-scale transfers of troops were only possible thanks to the offensive of the Austro-Hungarian troops on the Dniester that was thwarted at the very beginning. The 9th Army not only defended its positions, but also ensured the stability of a significant section of the front.

== Outcome ==
Austro-Hungarian troops were unable to cross the Dniester and defeat the Russian troops in eastern Galicia. Their trophies amounted to only 7 machine guns and 5,168 prisoners (34 of them officers).
