= 7th Cavalry Division (Russian Empire) =

- 7-я кавалерийская дивизия
- Active: 1875–1918
- Country: Russian Empire
- Allegiance: 19th Army Corps, Warsaw Military District
- Branch: Russian Imperial Army
- Role: Cavalry

The 7th Cavalry Division (Russian: 7-я кавалерийская дивизия, 7-ya Kavaleriiskaya Diviziya) was a cavalry formation of the Russian Imperial Army.

== Organization ==
- 1st Cavalry Brigade
  - Kinbourne 7th Regiment of Dragoons
  - Olviopol 7th Alfonso the XIII King of Spain's Own Uhlan Regiment
- 2nd Cavalry Brigade
  - Belorussian 7th Regiment of Hussars
  - 11th graf Denisov's Regiment of Don Cossacks
- 7th Horse Artillery Division

== Great War ==
On June 15, 1915 the entire division under the supreme command of Lt.–General Theodore von Rohrberg (Russian: Фёдор Сергеевич Рерберг) finally managed to stop the advance of German forces under August von Mackensen by means of breaking in between the Germans' first and second lines and completely destroying all the means of communication and artillery support, including tens of heavy artillery pieces and machine-guns, suffering just 200 casualties. As a result, Russians were able to start the Great Retreat of 1915 without experiencing instant German pressure.

== Headquarters ==
- Kovel — 1903–1909
- Volodymyr-Volynskyi — 1913–1914

== Commanders (Division Chiefs) ==
- 1905: Leonid Fomin
- 1907–1912: Mikhail Mikhailovich Pleshkov
- 1914–1917: Theodore von Rohrberg
