= 2nd Cavalry Division (Russian Empire) =

- 2-я кавалерийская дивизия
- Active: 1875–1918
- Country: Russian Empire
- Branch: Russian Imperial Army
- Role: Cavalry
- Engagements: World War I; Battle of Tannenberg

The 2nd Cavalry Division (Russian: 2-я кавалерийская дивизия, 2-ya Kavaleriiskaya Diviziya) was a cavalry formation of the Russian Imperial Army.

In 1914, the division was headquartered at Suwałki, part of the 2nd Army Corps.

== Organization ==
In 1914, the division included the following units:

- 1st Cavalry Brigade (Suwalki)
  - 2nd Pskov Life Dragoon Regiment (Suwalki)
  - 2nd Courland Life Uhlan Regiment (Kalvarija)
- 2nd Cavalry Brigade (Suwalki)
  - 2nd Pavlograd Life Hussar Regiment (Suwalki)
  - 2nd Don Cossack Regiment (Augustów)
- 2nd Horse Artillery Battalion (Suwalki)

== Commanders (Division Chiefs) ==
- 1884–1892: Feofil Egorovich Meindorf
- 1899–1901: Pavel Plehve
- 1905: Alexander Dubensky
- 1909: Afanasy Tsurikov
- 1914: Huseyn Khan Nakhchivanski

== Chiefs of Staff ==
- 12/03/1876 - 07/19/1877 - Colonel Povalo-Shveikovsky, Alexander Nikolaevich
- 11/06/1877 - 05/21/1886 - Colonel Gek, Andrey Konstantinovich
- 03/26/1887 - 03/10/1889 - Colonel Schwemberger, Joseph Fedorovich
- 03/10/1889 - 04/15/1890 - Colonel Avramov, Vladimir Alexandrovich
- 04/19/1890 - 01/07/1891 - Colonel Litvinov, Alexander Ivanovich
- 01/07/1891 - 02/27/1891 - Colonel Mikhailov, Nikolai Grigorievich
- February 27, 1891 - December 20, 1892 - Colonel Nikolai Bobyr
- 01/26, 1893 - 11/20, 1895 - Colonel Popov, Ivan Vasilievich
- 11/27, 1895 - 02/29, 1896 - Colonel Ugryumov, Andrei Alexandrovich
- 03/18, 1896 - 08/17, 1896 - Colonel Eichgolts, Alexander Rudolfovich
- 09/04, 1896 - March 27, 1898 - Colonel Vladimir Apollonovich Olokhov
- 03/27, 1898 - 02/25, 1899 - Colonel Nekrasov
- 03/20, 1899 - 06/04, 1902 - Colonel Prince Begildeev, Konstantin Sergeevich
- July 20, 1902 - October 19, 1904 - Colonel Nikolai Volodchenko
- December 30, 1904 - February 23, 1907 - Colonel Johnson, Herbert Georgievich
- 03/12/1907 - 07/23/1908 - Colonel ND Polivanov
- 08/02/1908 - 10/13/1908 - Colonel Fedotov, Alexander Ippolitovich
- 10.21.1908—09.07.1912 - Colonel Sencha, Vladimir Ivanovich
- 07/11/1912 - 03/25/1913 - Colonel Stepanov, Nikolai Alexandrovich
- 03/25/1913 - 08/22/1914 - Colonel Chesnakov, Pyotr Vladimirovich
- 08/22/1914 - 12/02/1915 - Wreed Colonel Gotovsky, Vladimir Nikolaevich
- 01/15/1916 - 01/18/1917 - Colonel Chesnakov, Pyotr Vladimirovich
- 04/02/1917 - 05/12/1917 - Major General of the General Staff Goncharenko, Georgy Ivanovich

== Commanders of the 1st Brigade ==
- 1905: Nikolai Papa-Afanasopulo
- April-August 1908: Gleb Vannovsky
- 1909: Evgeny Leontovich

== Commanders of the 2nd Brigade ==
- 1887: Nikolai Fedorovich Ilyin
- 1905: Mikhail Pleshkov
- 1909: Nikolai Leo
