= 1st Siberian Rifle Division =

1st Siberian Division
- 1-я Сибирская стрелковая дивизия
- Active: 1880–1918
- Country: Russian Empire
- Branch: Russian Imperial Army
- Role: Infantry
- Garrison/HQ: Ussuriysk
- Engagements: Russo-Japanese War; World War I

The 1st Siberian Rifle Division (Russian: 1-я Сибирская стрелковая дивизия, 1-ya Sibirskaya strelkovaya diviziya) was an infantry formation of the Russian Imperial Army that existed in various formations from the early 19th century until the end of World War I and the Russian Revolution. The division was based in Ussuriysk in the years leading up to 1914. It fought in World War I and was demobilized in 1918.

== Organization ==
The 1st Siberian Rifle Division was part of the 1st Siberian Army Corps. Its order of battle in from the Russo-Japanese War in 1905 to the outbreak of World War I in 1914 was as follows:

- 1st Brigade (HQ Nikolsk-Ussuriisk)
  - 1st His Majesty's Siberian Rifle Regiment
  - 2nd Adjutant-General Count Muravyov-Amursky Siberian Rifle Regiment
- 2nd Brigade (HQ Nikolsk-Ussuriisk)
  - 3rd Siberian Rifle Regiment
  - 4th Siberian Rifle Regiment
- 1st Siberian Rifle Artillery Brigade
