= Mikhail Pleshkov =

Russian equestrian

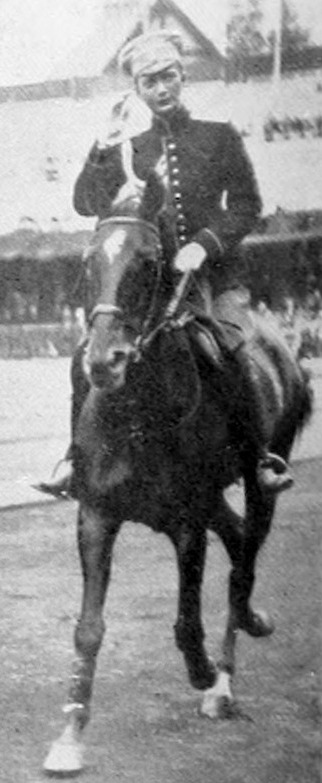
- Mikhail Pleshkov at the 1912 Olympics

Personal information
- Born: 6 March 1885
- Died: 12 November 1956 (aged 71) New York City, United States

Sport
- Sport: Horse riding

Mikhail Mikhaylovich Pleshkov Jr. (Russian: Михаил Михайлович Плешков; 6 March 1885 – 12 November 1956) was a Russian Empire equestrian and military officer. He competed in jumping at the 1912 Summer Olympics and finished 21st individually and fifth with the Russian team.

Pleshkov was the son of Russian general Mikhail Mikhaylovich Pleshkov Sr. He served in Russian cavalry and took part in World War I. On 30 December 1915, he received the rank of colonel, and starting from 1917 was acting as regiment commander, reaching the rank of general-major by 1919–20. During those years of the Russian Civil War, he was one of the leaders of the White movement in the Far East, and after its fall, emigrated from Russia. He died in 1956 in the United States.

== Bibliography ==
- Mikhail Mikhaylovich Pleshkov (1959) Мои воспоминания, Munich, 76 pp.
