= Greece during World War I =

Period of Greek history from 1914 to 1918

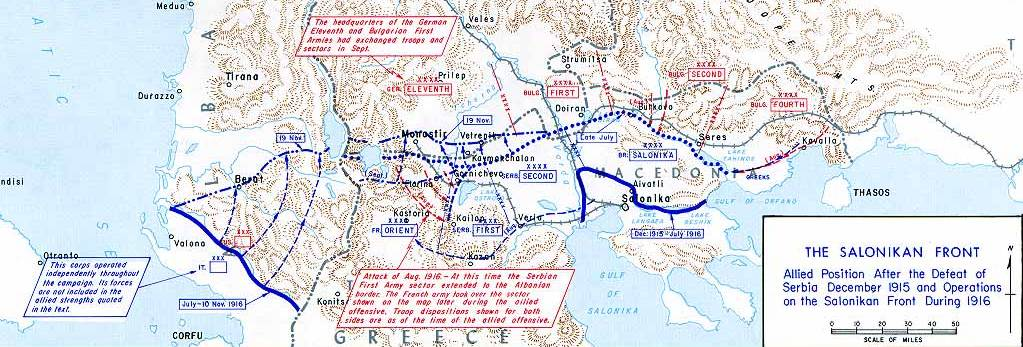
Operations at the border of Greece and Serbia, 1916.

At the outbreak of World War I in August 1914, the Kingdom of Greece remained neutral. Nonetheless, in October 1914, Greek forces once more occupied Northern Epirus, from where they had retreated after the end of the Balkan Wars. The disagreement between King Constantine, who favoured neutrality, and the pro-Allied Prime Minister Eleftherios Venizelos led to the National Schism, the division of the state between two rival governments. Finally, Greece united and joined the Allies in the summer of 1917.

== Background ==
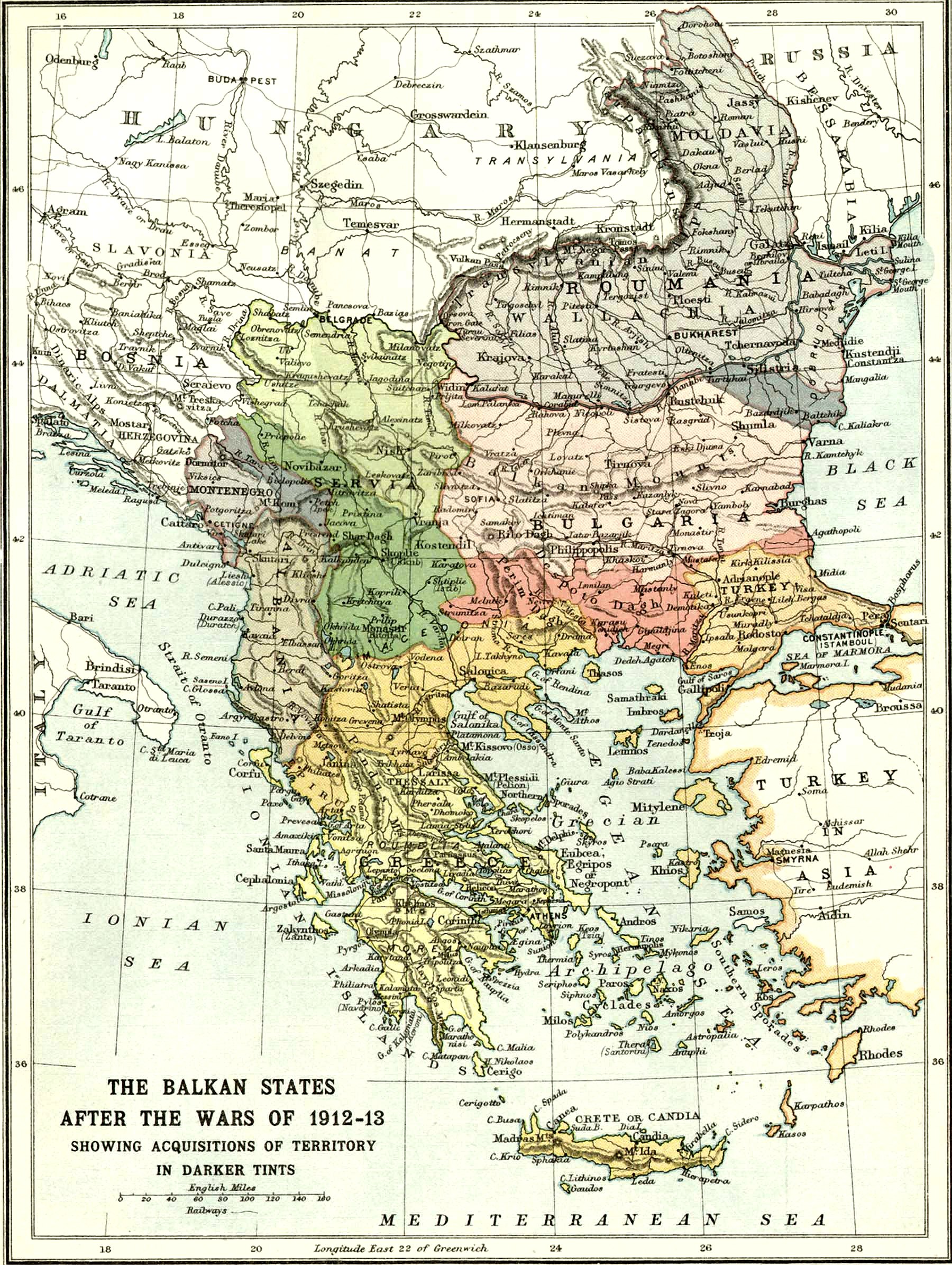
The Balkans after the Balkan Wars

Greece had emerged victorious from the 1912–1913 Balkan Wars with its territory almost doubled, but found itself in a difficult international situation. The status of the Greek-occupied eastern Aegean islands was left undetermined and the Ottoman Empire continued to claim them, leading to a naval arms race and mass expulsions of ethnic Greeks from Anatolia (Asia Minor). In the north, Bulgaria, defeated in the Second Balkan War, harbored plans for revenge against Greece and Serbia.

Greece and Serbia were bound by a treaty of alliance, signed on 1 June 1913, which promised reciprocal military assistance in case of an attack by a third party, referring to Bulgaria. However, in the spring and summer of 1914, Greece found itself in a confrontation with the Ottoman Empire over the status of the eastern Aegean islands, coupled with a naval race between the two countries and persecutions of the Greeks in Asia Minor. On 11 June, the Greek government issued an official protest to the Porte, threatening a breach of relations and even war if the persecutions were not stopped. On the next day, Greece requested the assistance of Serbia should matters come to a head, but on 16 June, the Serbian government replied that due to the country's exhaustion after the Balkan Wars, and the hostile stance of Albania and Bulgaria, Serbia could not commit to Greece's aid and recommended that war be avoided. On 19 June 1914, the Army Staff Service, under Lt. Colonel Ioannis Metaxas, presented a study it had prepared on possible military options against Turkey. This found that the only truly decisive manoeuvre, a landing of the entire Hellenic Army in Asia Minor, was impossible due to the hostility of Bulgaria. Instead, Metaxas proposed the sudden occupation of the Gallipoli Peninsula without a prior declaration of war, along with the clearing of the Dardanelles and the occupation of Constantinople so as to force the Ottomans to negotiate. However, on the previous day, the Ottoman government had suggested joint talks, and the tension eased enough for Greek Prime Minister Eleftherios Venizelos and the Ottoman Grand Vizier, Said Halim Pasha, to meet in Brussels in July.

The anticipated conflict would emerge from a different quarter however, when on 28 June, the Assassination of Archduke Franz Ferdinand led Austria-Hungary to declare war on Serbia and initiate the outbreak of the First World War a month later.

== Between war and neutrality: August 1914 – August 1915 ==
=== Political considerations: Venizelos and King Constantine ===
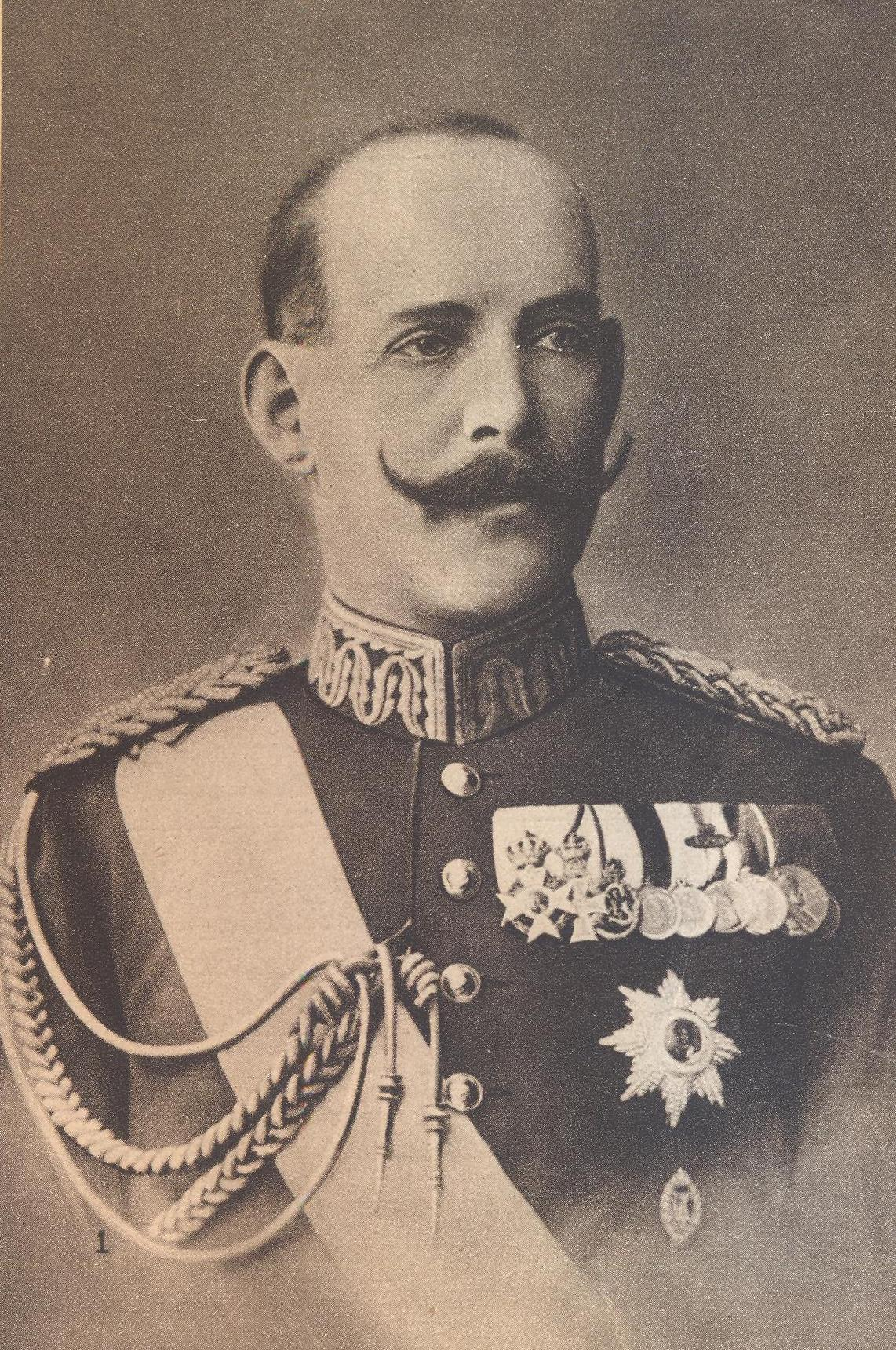
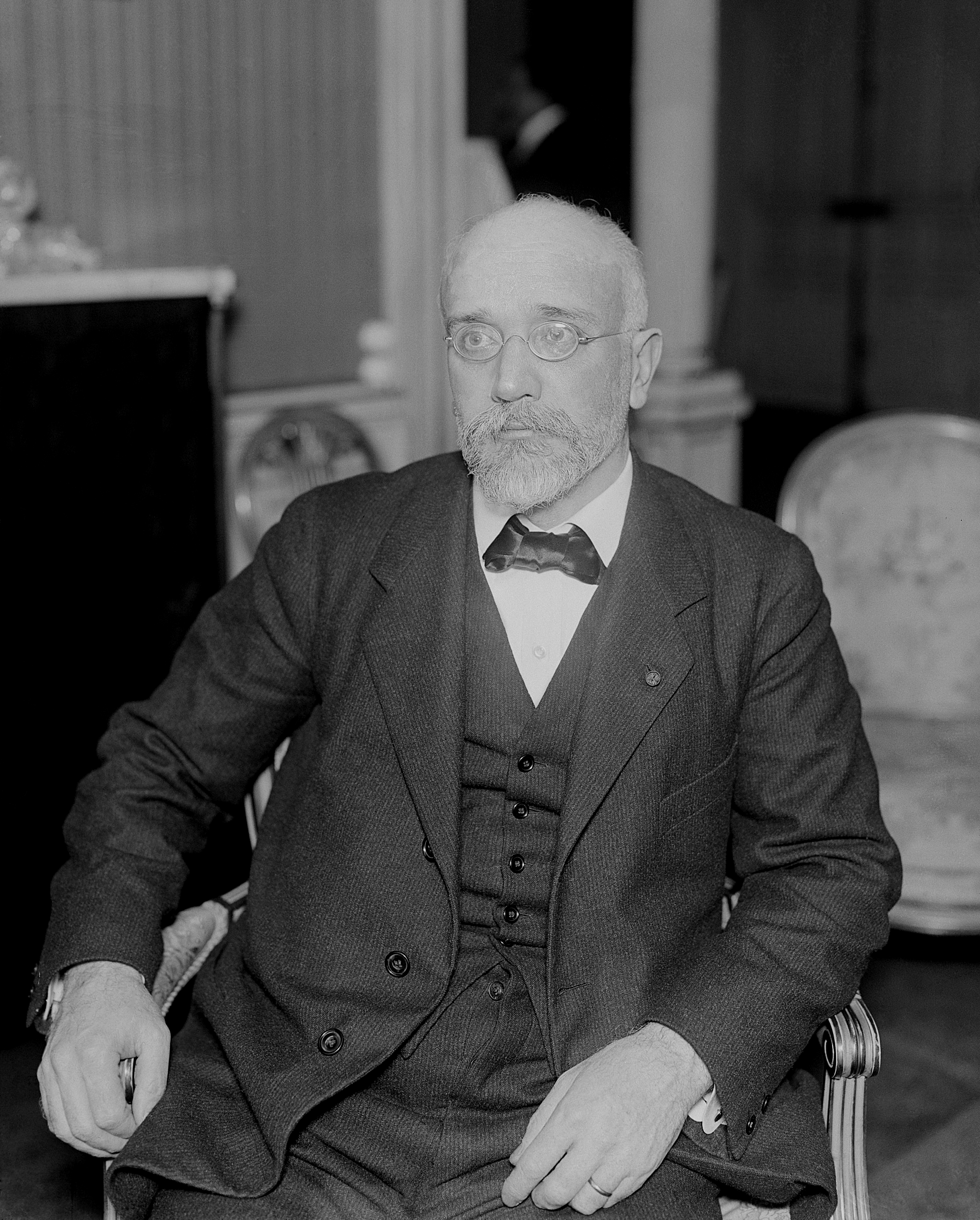
The two protagonists of the Greek political scene during World War I: King Constantine I of Greece (left) and Prime Minister Eleftherios Venizelos (right)

Faced with the prospect of an initially localized Austro-Serbian war, the Greek leadership was unanimous that the country would remain neutral despite the mutual assistance terms of the alliance with Serbia. Greece was prepared to enter the conflict only in the event of a Bulgarian intervention, in which case the entire balance of power in the Balkans would be jeopardized. Furthermore, as it quickly became evident that the conflict would not remain localized but expand to a general European war, any previous considerations by the Balkan countries were upended. This was notably the case for Greece and Romania: both had a stake in maintaining the favourable status quo in the Balkans, but their interests diverged. Thus, once Romania declared its neutrality and refused to undertake any commitments in the event of a Bulgarian attack on Serbia, Greece could not count on Romanian assistance against Bulgaria or the Ottomans, and was, in the view of Venizelos, effectively left diplomatically isolated in the region.

Furthermore, the Greek political leadership was divided in its views on the likely outcome of the war, and hence on the most appropriate Greek policy regarding the combatant coalitions. Prime Minister Venizelos believed that even if Germany and its allies in the Central Powers prevailed in Central Europe, Britain, with its naval might, would prevail at least in the Near East where Greece's interests lay. Venizelos also considered that Greece's two main rivals, Bulgaria and the Ottoman Empire, were likely to join the Central Powers since their interests aligned with those of Germany. The conflict with the Ottomans over the islands of the eastern Aegean, or the pogroms against the Greeks in the Ottoman Empire in particular, were fresh in his mind. Moreover, as the Ottomans were clearly drifting towards the German camp, the opportunity of joint action with the Allied Powers against them should not be missed. While for the moment Venizelos was prepared to remain neutral as the best course of action, his ultimate aim was to enter the war on the side of the Allied Powers should Bulgaria attack Serbia or should the Allies make proposals that would satisfy Greek claims.

King Constantine I on the other hand, backed by Foreign Minister Georgios Streit and the General Staff, were convinced of Germany's eventual triumph and furthermore sympathized with the German militarist political system. As Greece was highly vulnerable to the Allied navies and thus unable to openly side with the Central Powers, Constantine and his supporters argued for firm and "permanent" neutrality. The thinking of Streit, the King's main political advisor on the subject, was influenced by his fear of pan-Slavism (in the first instance Bulgaria, but ultimately represented by Russia) against which Germany supposedly fought, as well as by his belief that the traditional European balance of power would not be upset by the war, leaving little room for territorial gains by Greece in the event of its participation in the conflict. In particular, and in contrast to Venizelos, Streit believed that even if they won, the Allies would respect the territorial integrity of both Austria–Hungary and the Ottoman Empire.

In addition, the King and his military advisors regarded the German army as invincible, while their differences with Venizelos exposed far deeper ideological divergences in Greek society as well: Venizelos represented the middle-class, liberal parliamentary democracy that had emerged after 1909, whereas the King and his supporters represented the traditional elites. Constantine was profoundly impressed by German militarism, Streit was a major proponent of royalist and conservative ideas, while the highly influential Chief of the General Staff Metaxas—who would later as dictator of Greece in 1936–1941 preside over a Fascist-leaning authoritarian regime—was already toying with proto-Fascist ideas.

This disagreement became evident as early as 6 August, when Streit clashed with Venizelos and submitted his resignation. Venizelos refused to accept it so as to avoid a political crisis, while the King also urged Streit to retract it, for fear that his replacement would allow Venizelos to push the government even further towards a pro-Allied course. Thus, when on 25 July the Serbian government requested Greece's aid under the terms of their alliance, Venizelos replied on 2 August that Greece would remain a friendly neutral. The Greek prime minister argued that an important clause in the alliance agreement was rendered impossible: Serbia had undertaken to provide 150,000 troops in the area of Gevgelija to guard against a Bulgarian attack. Furthermore, if Greece sent her army to fight the Austrians along the Danube, this would only incite a Bulgarian attack against both countries, which possessed insufficient forces to oppose it. On the other hand, Venizelos and King Constantine were in agreement when they rejected a German demand on 27 July to join the Central Powers.

=== Early negotiations between Greece and the Allies ===
Already on 7 August, Venizelos sounded out the Allies by submitting a proposal for a Balkan bloc against Austria–Hungary, with wide-ranging territorial concessions and swaps among the Balkan states. The plan led nowhere, primarily due to Russian involvement in the affairs of Bulgaria and Serbia, but it did signal that Venizelos was ready to abandon the territorial status quo as long as Greek interests were safeguarded. On 14 August 1914, Venizelos submitted a request to Britain, France, and Russia on their stance towards Greece, should the latter aid Serbia against Bulgaria and Turkey. This was followed on 18 August by a formal offer of alliance. Venizelos' diplomatic initiative ran contrary to the Allies' intentions at the time, which were focused on enticing Bulgaria to join their cause, even offering its territorial concessions at the expense of Serbia, Romania, and Greece. For his part, Venizelos sought to counter such Allied designs by threatening the Allied governments with resignation, an eventuality which opened up the prospect of a pro-German government in Athens. Russia, which pressed for more concessions to Bulgaria, considered its geopolitical interests best served if Greece remained neutral. In addition, a Greek entry into the war on the Allied side might also precipitate the entry of the Ottomans on the side of the Central Powers, a prospect of particular concern to the British, who feared an adverse impact on the millions of Muslim colonial subjects of the British Empire should the Ottoman Caliph declare war on Britain. As a result, only Britain replied to Venizelos' offer of alliance, to the effect that as long as the Ottomans remained neutral, Greece should do the same, whereas if Turkey entered the war, Greece would be welcome as an ally.

These initiatives deepened the rift between Venizelos and the camp around the King. Venizelos anticipated a Bulgarian attack on Serbia either as a member of the Central Powers or independently; since that would be contrary to Greek interests, Greece's entry into the war on the Allies' side was only a matter of time. For the King and his advisors, however, any action hostile to Germany was to be avoided, and that included opposing any Bulgarian attack on Serbia, if that was done in alliance with Germany. King Constantine and Streit considered ousting the Prime Minister, but hesitated doing so given Venizelos' considerable parliamentary majority; instead, on 18 August, the same day that Venizelos submitted his proposals to the Allies, Streit resigned.

In early September, the ongoing negotiations between Greece and the Ottoman Empire were stopped, as the Ottomans drifted further towards entry into the war, despite Berlin's urging them to refrain from actions that might drive Greece into the Allied camp. At the same time, Britain suggested staff talks on a possible joint attack on Turkey in the Dardanelles. The suggestion was quickly dropped, because the Allies continued insisting on concessions to Bulgaria, but precipitated a major crisis between Venizelos and the King. Against Venizelos' recommendations, the King refused to agree to participate in an Allied attack on the Ottomans unless Turkey attacked first. On 7 September, Venizelos submitted his resignation, along with a memorandum outlining his geopolitical considerations; bowing to his Prime Minister's popularity and parliamentary support, the King rejected the resignation.

On 2 December, Serbia repeated its request for Greek assistance, which was supported by the Allied governments. Venizelos asked Metaxas for the Army Staff Service's evaluation of the situation. The opinion of the latter was that without a simultaneous entry of Romania into the war on the side of the Allies, Greece's position was too risky. Following the firm refusal of Romania to be drawn into the conflict at this time, the proposal was scuttled.

On 24 January 1915, the British offered Greece "significant territorial concessions in Asia Minor" if it would enter the war in support of Serbia, and in exchange for satisfying some of the Bulgarian territorial demands in Macedonia (Kavala, Drama, and Chrysoupolis) in exchange for Bulgarian entry into the war on the Allies' side. Venizelos argued in favour of the proposal, but again the opinion of Metaxas was negative, for much the same reasons: according to Metaxas, the Austrians were likely to defeat the Serbian army before a Greek mobilization could be completed, and Bulgaria was likely to flank any Greek forces fighting against the Austrians, while a Romanian intervention would not be decisive. Metaxas judged that even if Bulgaria joined the Allies, it still would not suffice to shift the balance in Central Europe in the Allies' favour. He therefore recommended the presence of four Allied army corps in Macedonia as the minimum necessary force for any substantial aid to the Greeks and Serbs. Furthermore, he noted that a Greek entry into the war would once again expose the Greeks of Asia Minor to Turkish reprisals. Venizelos rejected this report and recommended entry into the war in a memorandum to the King, provided that Bulgaria and Romania also joined the Allies. The situation changed almost immediately when a large German loan to Bulgaria, and the conclusion of a Bulgarian-Ottoman agreement for the shipment of war material through Bulgaria, became known. On 15 February, the Allies reiterated their request and even offered to send Anglo-French troops to Thessaloniki. However, the Greek government again refused, its final decision again hinging on the stance of Romania, which again decided to remain neutral.

=== The Gallipoli Campaign and the first resignation of Venizelos ===
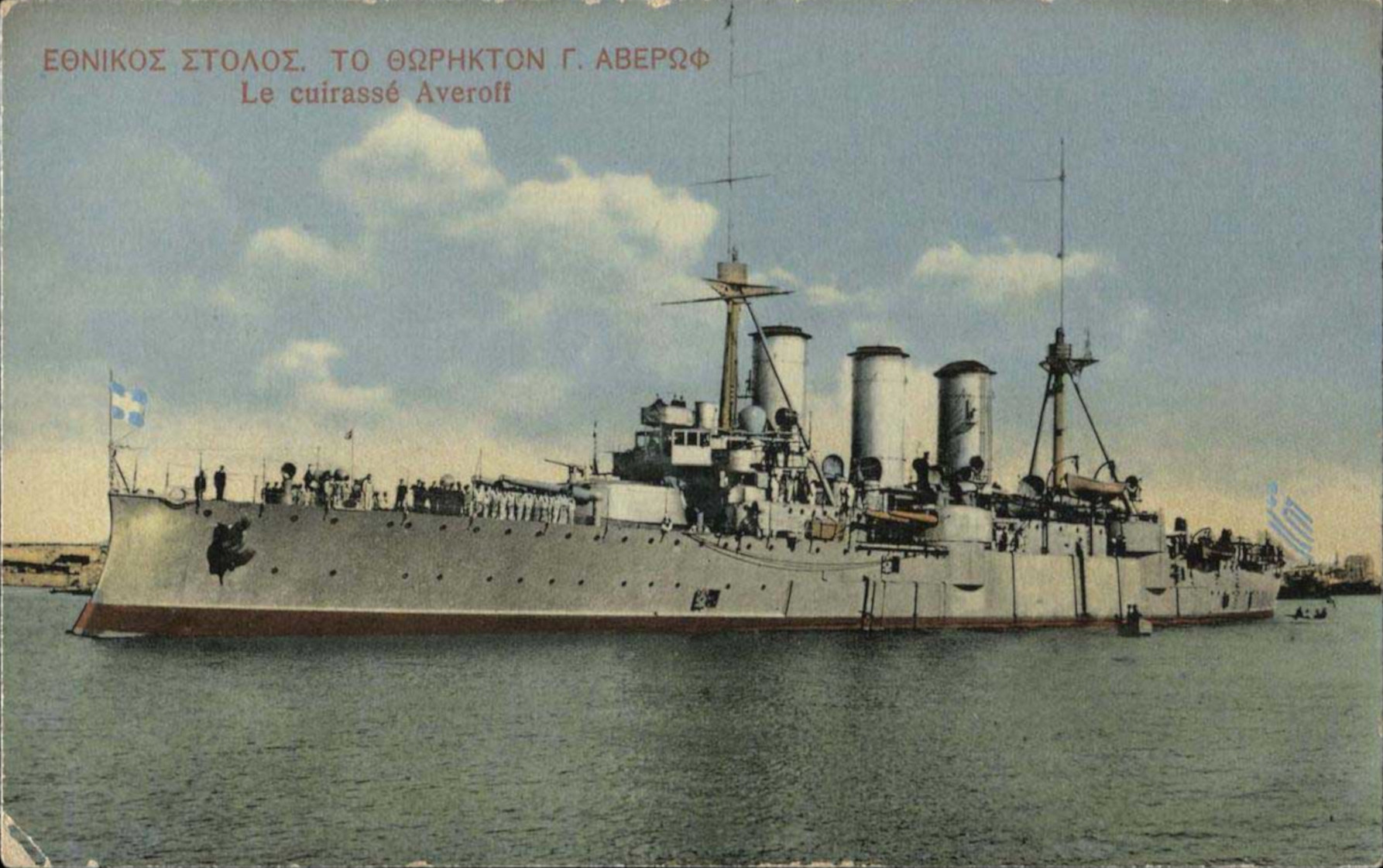
Colored postcard of greek armored cruiser Georgios Averof c. 1915.

However, in February, the Allied attack on Gallipoli began, with naval bombardments of the Ottoman forts there. Venizelos decided to offer an army corps and the entire Greek fleet to assist the Allies, making an official offer on 1 March, despite the King's reservations. This caused Metaxas to resign on the next day, while meetings of the Crown Council (the King, Venizelos, and the living former prime ministers) on 3 and 5 March proved indecisive. King Constantine decided to keep the country neutral, whereupon Venizelos submitted his resignation on 6 March 1915. This time it was accepted, and he was replaced by Dimitrios Gounaris, who formed his government on 10 March.

On 12 March, the new government suggested to the Allies its willingness to join them, under certain conditions. The Allies, however, expected a victory of Venizelos in the forthcoming elections and were in no hurry to commit themselves. Thus on 12 April, they replied to Gounaris' proposal, offering territorial compensation in vague terms the Aydin Vilayet—anything more concrete was impossible since at the same time the Allies were negotiating with Italy on its own demands in the same area—while making no mention of Greece's territorial integrity vis-a-vis Bulgaria, as Venizelos had already proven himself willing to countenance the cession of Kavala to Bulgaria.

The Liberal Party won the 12 June elections, and Venizelos again formed a government on 30 August, with the firm intention of bringing Greece into the war on the side of the Allies. In the meantime, on 3 August, the British formally requested, on behalf of the Allies, the cession of Kavala to Bulgaria; this was rejected on 12 August, before Venizelos took office.

== Compromised neutrality: September 1915 – September 1916 ==
=== Bulgaria and Greece mobilize; Allied landing at Thessaloniki ===
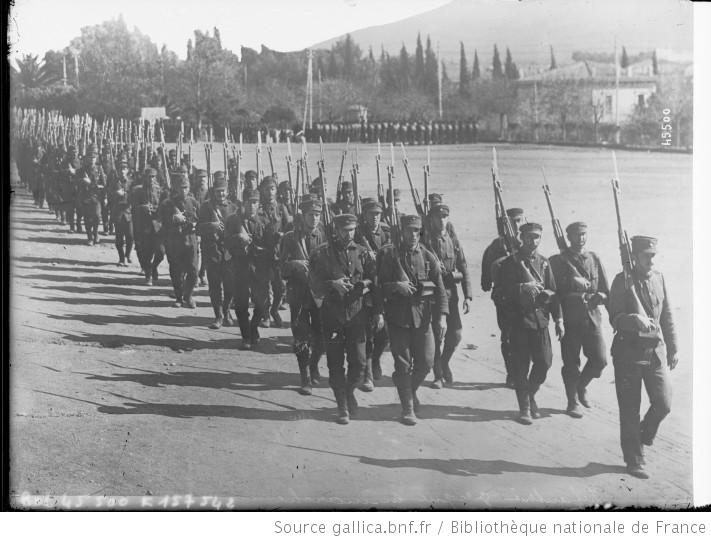
Mobilisation of the Greek army, summer 1915

On 6 September, Bulgaria signed a treaty of alliance with Germany, and a few days later mobilized against Serbia. Venizelos ordered a Greek counter-mobilization on 23 September. While 24 classes of men were called to arms, the mobilization proceeded with numerous difficulties and delays, as infrastructure or even military registers were lacking in the areas recently acquired during the Balkan Wars. Five army corps and 15 infantry divisions were eventually mobilized, but there were insufficient officers to man all the units, reservists tarried in presenting themselves to the recruiting stations, and there was a general lack of means of transport to bring them to their units. In the end, only the III, IV, and V Corps were assembled in Macedonia, while the divisions of I and II Corps largely remained behind in "Old Greece". Likewise, III Corps' 11th Infantry Division remained in Thessaloniki, rather than proceeding to the staging areas along the border.

As the likelihood of a Bulgarian entry into the war on the side of the Central Powers loomed larger, the Serbs requested Greek assistance in virtue of the terms of the treaty of alliance. Again, however, the issue of Serbian assistance against Bulgaria around Gevgelija was raised: even after mobilization, Greece could muster only 160,000 men against 300,000 Bulgarians. As the Serbs were too hard-pressed to divert any troops to assist Greece, on 22 September Venizelos asked the Anglo-French to assume that role. The Allies gave a favourable reply on 24 September, but they did not have the 150,000 men required; as a result, the King, the Army Staff Service, and large part of the opposition preferred to remain neutral until the Allies could guarantee effective support. Venizelos, however, asked the French ambassador to send Allied troops to Thessaloniki as quickly as possible, but to give a warning of 24 hours to the Greek government; Greece would lodge a formal complaint at the violation of its neutrality, but then accept the fait accompli. As a result, the French 156th Division and the British 10th Division were ordered to embark from Gallipoli for Thessaloniki.

However, the Allies failed to inform Athens, leading to a tense stand-off. When the Allied warships arrived in the Thermaic Gulf on the morning of 30 September, the local Greek commander, the head of III Corps, Lt. General Konstantinos Moschopoulos, unaware of the diplomatic manoeuvres, refused them entry pending instructions from Athens. Venizelos was outraged that the Allies had not informed him as agreed, and refused to allow their disembarkation. After a tense day, the Allies agreed to halt their approach until the Allied diplomats could arrange matters with Venizelos in Athens. Finally, during the night of 1–2 October, Venizelos gave the green light for the disembarkation, which began on the same morning. The Allies issued a communique justifying their landing as a necessary measure to secure their lines of communication with Serbia, to which the Greek government replied with a protest but no further actions.

=== Dismissal of Venizelos; the Zaimis government and the collapse of Serbia ===
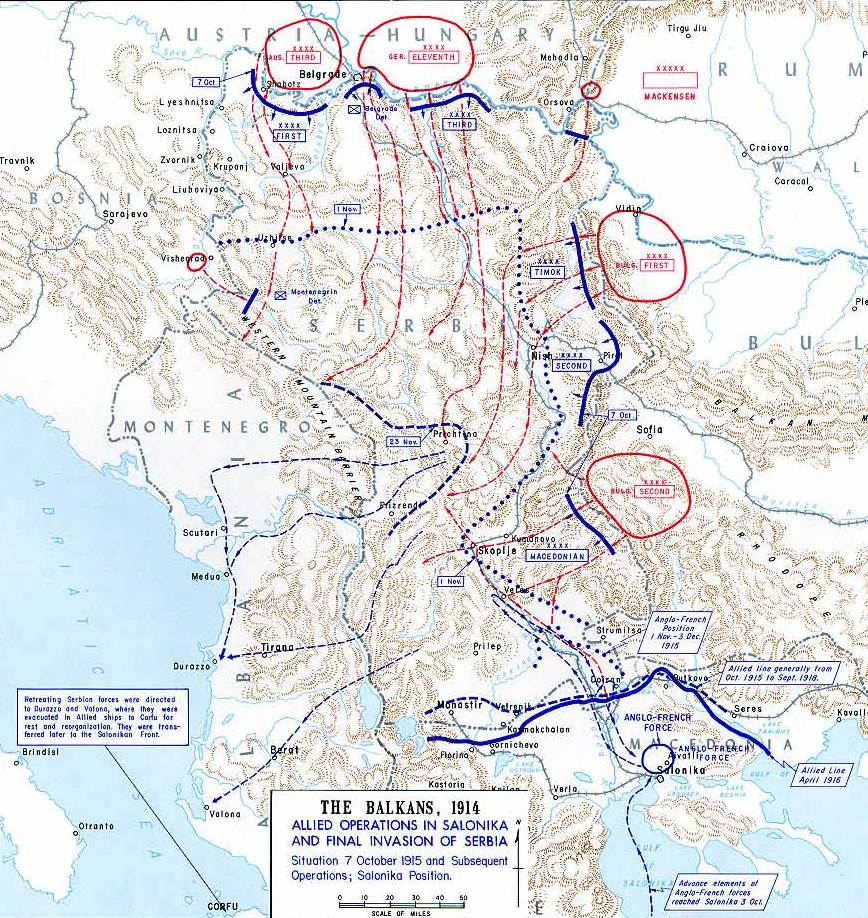
The Bulgarian attack and the collapse of Serbia

Following this event, Venizelos presented to Parliament his case for participation in the war, securing 152 votes in favour to 102 against on 5 October. On the next day, however, King Constantine dismissed Venizelos and called upon Alexandros Zaimis to form a government. Zaimis was favourably disposed to the Allies, but the military situation was worse than a few months before: the Serbs were stretched to breaking point against the Austro-Germans, Romania remained staunchly neutral, Bulgaria was on the verge of entering the war on the side of the Central Powers, and the Allies had few reserves to provide any practical aid to Greece. When the Serbian staff colonel Milan Milovanović visited Athens to elicit the new government's intentions, Metaxas informed him that if Greece sent two army corps to Serbia, eastern Macedonia would be left defenceless, so that the line of communication of both the Serbs and the Greek forces would be cut off by the Bulgarians. Metaxas proposed instead a joint offensive against Bulgaria, with the Greeks attacking along the Nestos and Strymon valleys, the Allies from the Vardar valley, and the Serbs joining in. Milovanović informed Metaxas that the pressure on the Serbian Army left them unable to spare forces for any such operation. On 10 October, the Zaimis government officially informed Serbia that it could not come to its aid. Even an offer of Cyprus by the British on 16 October was not enough to alter the new government's stance.

Indeed, on 7 October the Austro-German forces under August von Mackensen began their decisive offensive against Serbia, followed by a Bulgarian attack on 14 October, without prior declaration of war. The Bulgarian attack cut off the Serbian retreat south to Greece, forcing the Serbian army to retreat via Albania. The French commander-designate in Thessaloniki, Maurice Sarrail, favoured a large-scale Allied operation in Macedonia against Bulgaria, but available forces were few; the British especially were loath to evacuate Gallipoli, while the French commander-in-chief, Joseph Joffre, was reluctant to divert forces from the Western Front. In the end, it was agreed to send 150,000 troops to the "Salonika front", approximately half each French—the "Armée d'Orient" under Sarrail, with the 156th, 57th, and 122nd divisions—and British—the "British Salonika Force" under Bryan Mahon, with 10th Division, XII Corps and XVI Corps.

On 22 October, the Bulgarians captured Skopje, thus cutting off the Serbs from the Allied forces assembling in Thessaloniki. In an attempt to link up with the retreating Serbs, Sarrail launched an attack against Skopje on 3–13 November, but the French government ordered him to stop his advance. A Serbian attack on the 20th was fought off by the Bulgarians, and any hope of the Serbs linking up with Sarrail's forces evaporated. As a result, though under constant pursuit, the remnants of the Serbian army retreated into Albania, aiming to reach the shores of the Adriatic, while Sarrail ordered his own forces to withdraw south towards Thessaloniki, re-crossing the Greek frontier on 13 December 1915. As the Bulgarians followed closely behind the Allies and attacked them during their retreat, there was concern that they would simply continue on past the border. Lt. General Moschopoulos' requests for instructions to Athens went unanswered, but on his own initiative he deployed the 3/40 Evzone Regiment to cover the border with at least a token force. In the event, the Central Powers halted before the Greek border, for the time being. Although the Austrian commander Franz Conrad von Hötzendorf pressed to complete the victory in Serbia by clearing Albania and evicting the Allies from Thessaloniki, and forcing Greece and Romania to enter the war on the side of the Central Powers, the German high command, under Erich von Falkenhayn, was eager to end operations so as to focus on his plan to win the war by bleeding the French army dry at the Battle of Verdun.

=== The Skouloudis government and the Allies; creation of the Salonica front ===
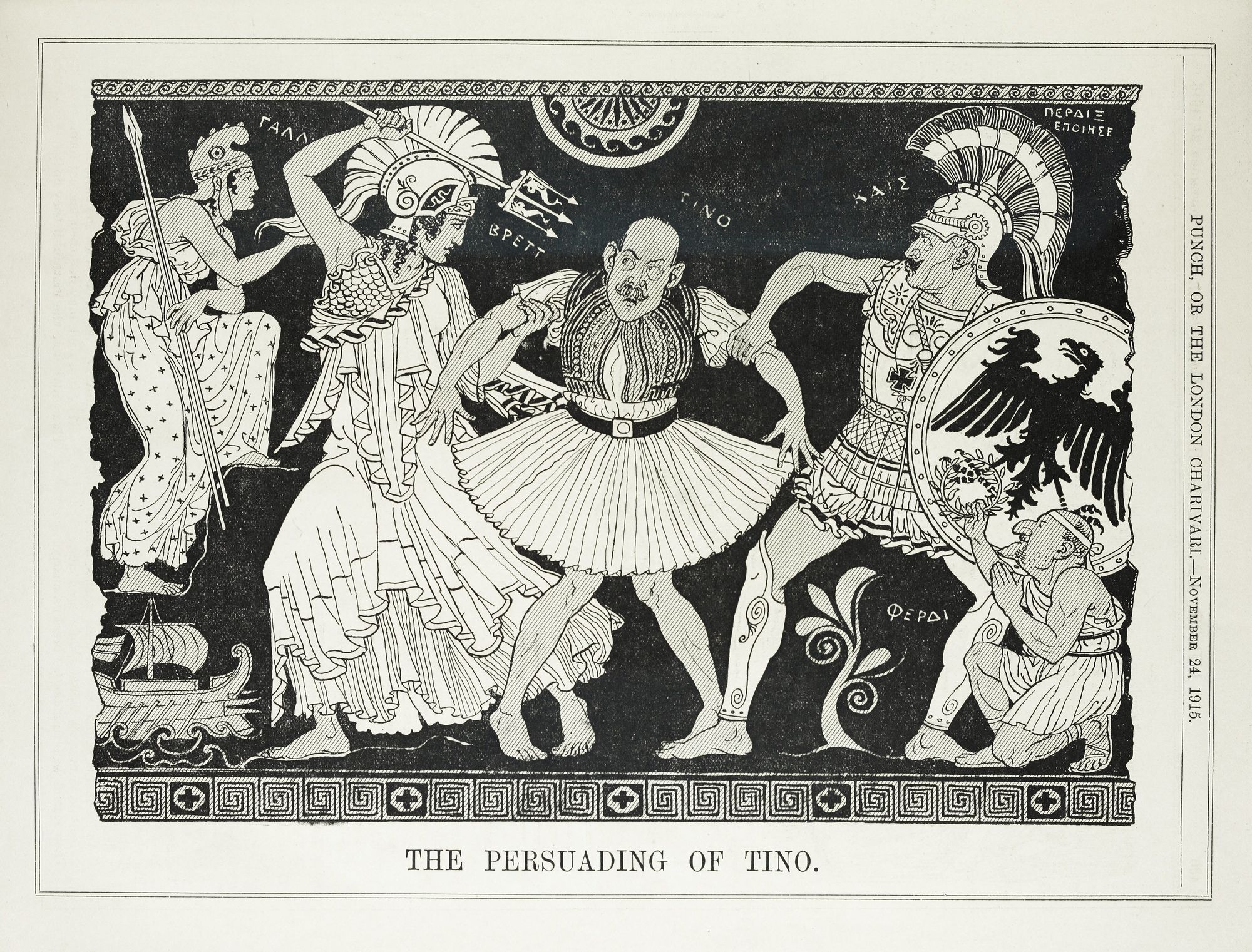
King Constantine ("Tino") being torn between Britannia and Marianne on the one, and Kaiser Wilhelm, assisted by Ferdinand of Bulgaria, on the other. Satirical cartoon in the style of an ancient Greek vase, published in Punch in November 1915

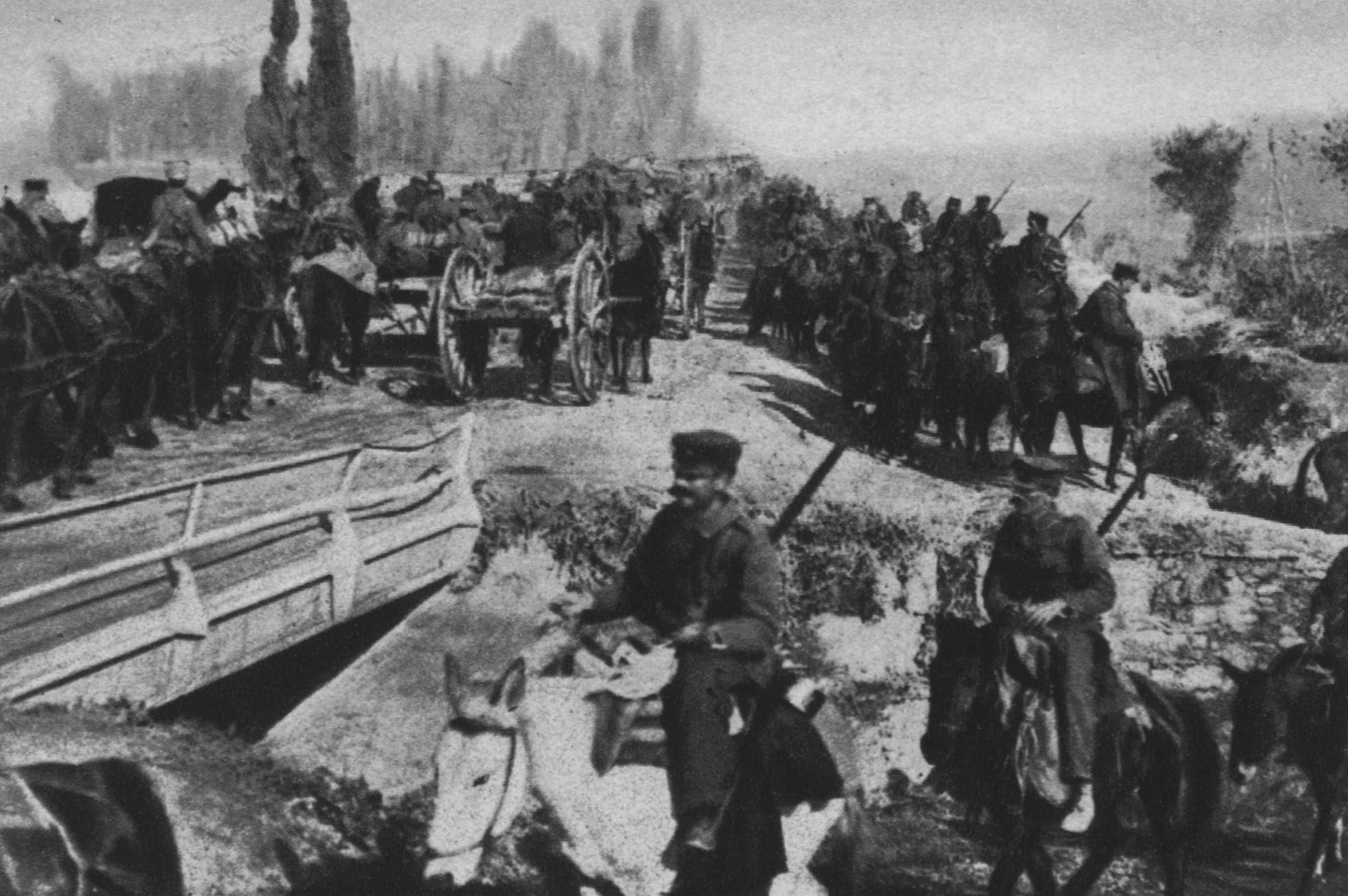
A French column (left) and a Greek column (right) heading in opposite directions, 6 November 1915

In the meantime, Greece descended further into political crisis: on the night of 3–4 November, the Zaimis government was voted down in Parliament, in a session in which the Minister of Military Affairs and a Venizelist MP came to blows. King Constantine named Stefanos Skouloudis as the new Prime Minister, with the same cabinet; the new prime minister took over the Ministry of Foreign Affairs himself. On 11 November, Parliament was dissolved again and elections set for 19 December.

The new government was pressured by Germany and Austria not to allow the Allies to withdraw into Greek territory, to which Skouloudis replied that Greece would implement the terms of the Hague Conventions, according to which the Allied forces would have to be disarmed once crossing into Greek soil. This created uproar among the Allied governments, who began clamouring for the evacuation of the Greek army from Macedonia, and the occupation of Milos and Piraeus by the Allied navies. Meanwhile, Greek merchant shipping was detained in Allied harbours and an unofficial embargo placed on Greece. On 19 November, the Greek government informed the Allies that their forces would not be disarmed, and that Greek forces in Macedonia were there to defend against Bulgarian attack rather than interfere with the Allies. Nevertheless, on 21 November the Allies occupied Milos, and two days later demanded formal and categorical assurances that their forces would enjoy freedom of movement and action in and around Thessaloniki; Skouloudis accepted, but two days later, the demands were upped, by demanding the removal of the Greek army from Thessaloniki, the placing of all roads and railroads in the direction of Serbia under Allied disposal, the permission to fortify the environs of Thessaloniki and Chalcidice, and unrestricted movement of the Allied fleets in Greek waters.

Following negotiations on 9–10 December at Thessaloniki between Sarrail and Mahon on the one side and Moschopoulos and Lt. Colonel Konstantinos Pallis on the other, a compromise was achieved: the Greek 11th Division would remain in Thessaloniki, and the Karabournou Fortress would remain in Greek hands; on the other hand, the Greek government promised not to interfere with any Allied measures to fortify their positions, and would remain neutral if Allied activity caused a third power to invade Greek territory. The Allies withdrew from Milos, while the Greek V Army Corps was moved east towards Nigrita, leaving the area between Thessaloniki and the northern Greek border devoid of troops.

This space was left to be defended by three French and five British divisions, which in December 1915–January 1916 entrenched themselves in a broad arc around Thessaloniki, from the Gulf of Orfanos in the east to the Vardar river in the west. The eastern portion of this front was held by the British, and the western third by the French. On 16 January 1916, Sarrail was appointed Allied commander-in-chief in Macedonia. The bulk of the Greek forces in the area assembled in eastern Macedonia (IV Army Corps east of the Strymon River, V Corps in the Nigrita area, and some support units of the I and II Corps around Mount Vermion). These forces faced the First and Second Bulgarian Armies.

=== German demands and encroachments of Greek sovereignty by the Allies ===
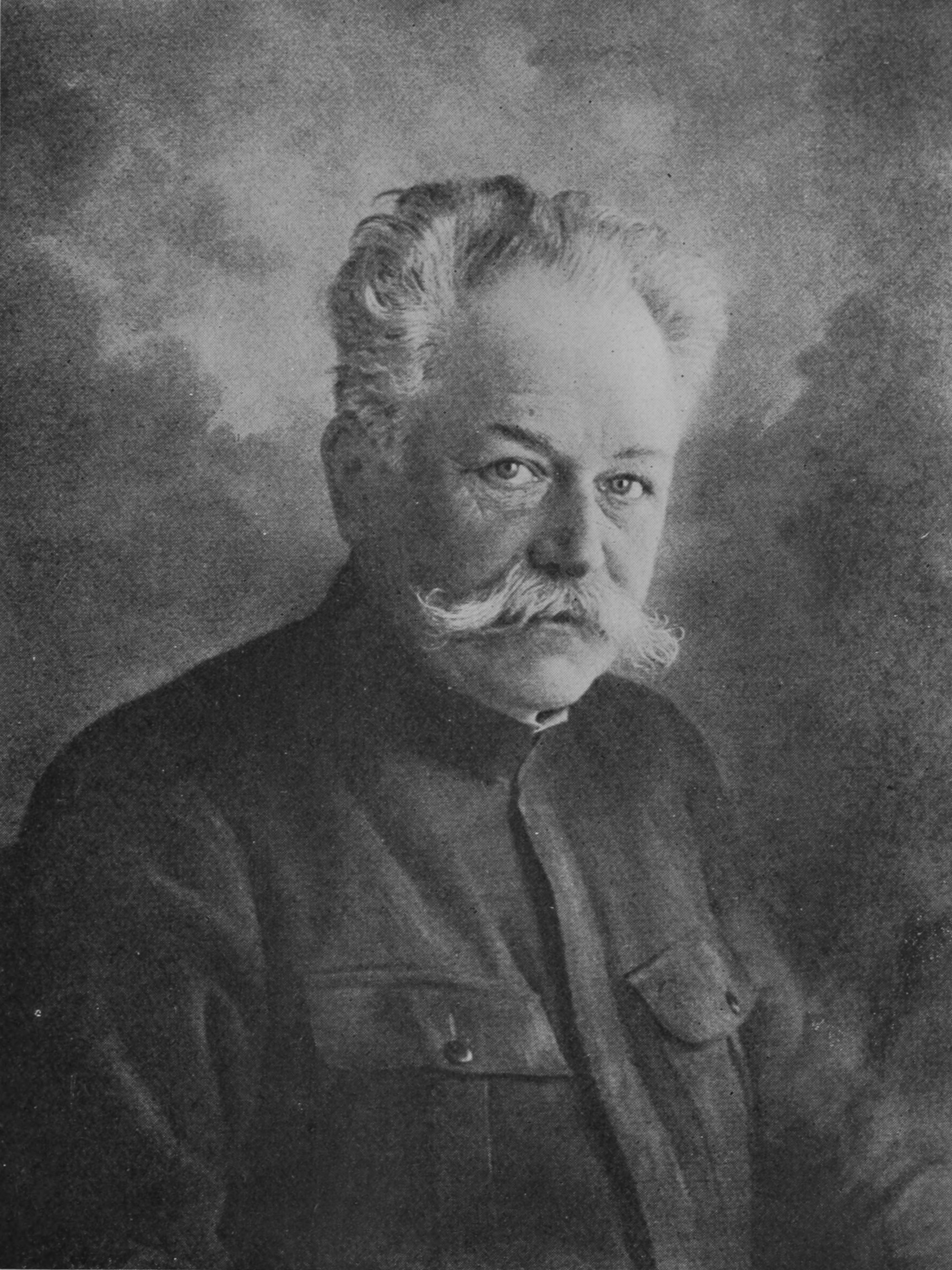
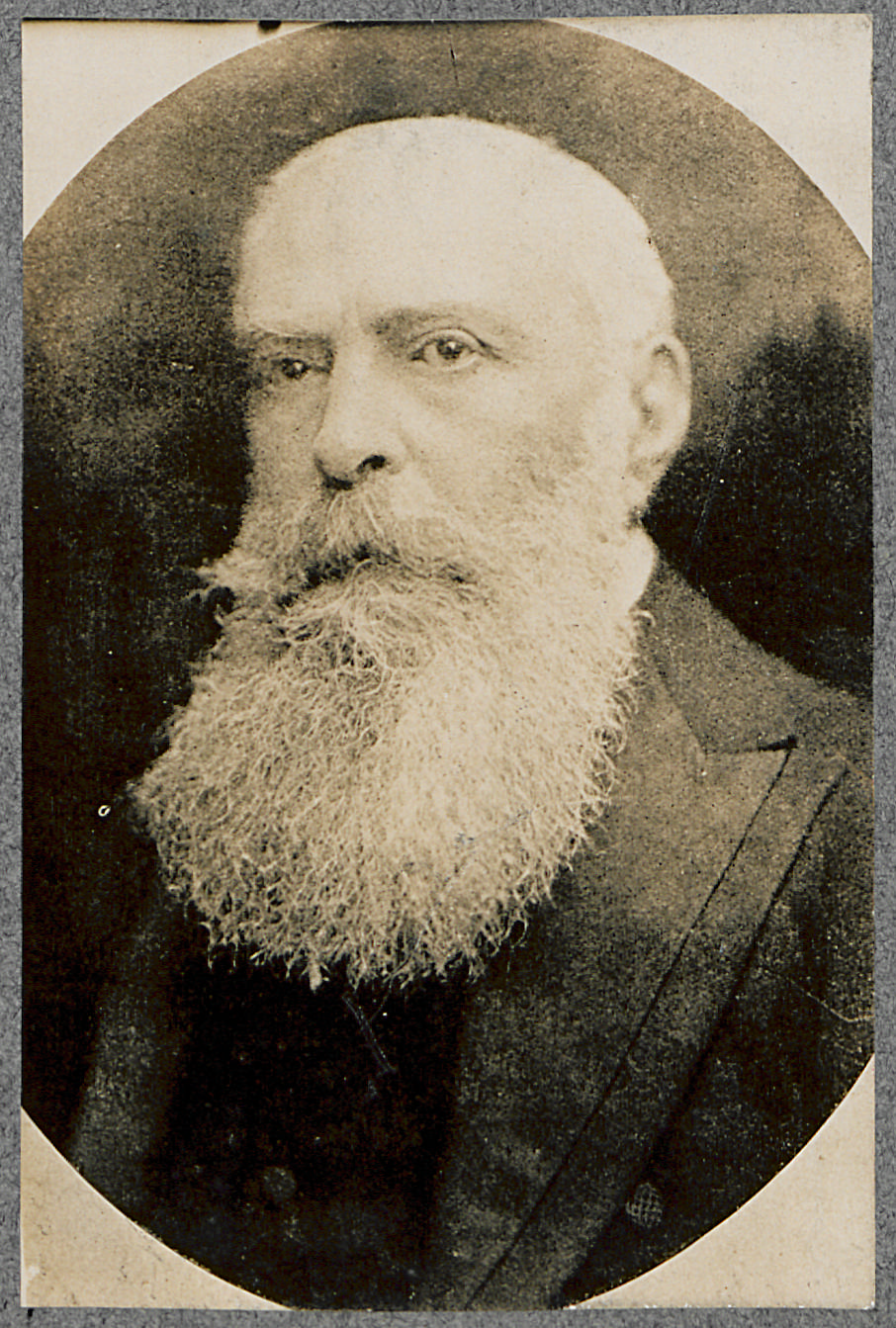
The Allied commander-in-chief in Macedonia, Maurice Sarrail (left) and the Greek Prime Minister Stefanos Skouloudis (right)

On the Central Powers' side, on 29 November 1915, Falkenhayn had publicly threatened that if Greece could not neutralize the Allied and Serbian forces on its soil, the Germans and their allies would cross the border and do it for them, and on 10 December, the German Foreign Ministry reacted to the new agreement between Greece and the Allies regarding their armies in Macedonia by demanding the same rights of free movement in Greek territory. To these demands, the Greek government answered on 22 December that it would not actively oppose a Central Powers invasion of its territory, provided that the Bulgarians did not participate or at least stayed out of the cities, and the command of the operations was in German hands; that Bulgaria issued no territorial demands; that the Central Powers forces would withdraw once their objectives were met; and that the Greek authorities remain in place.

On 6 January, Germany declared its willingness to respect Greek sovereignty, provided that the Greek army withdrew from the border area, with its bulk retiring west behind the Lake Prespa–Katerini line, leaving only V Corps in the Kavala area, and that any Allied attempts to land at either Kavala or Katerini were to be resisted. In this way, Macedonia would be left uncontested for the Allies and Central Powers to fight, while the remainder of Greece remained neutral. In late January, the Greek government submitted a broadly similar proposal, developed by Metaxas, to the Allies; while the British military attache and Sarrail initially accepted it, the French government decided to reject it, regarding it as a trap: the evacuation of the Nigrita–Drama area would expose the Allied flank to Bulgarian attacks, while conversely, the presence of the Greek army in Katerini would cover the Germans' right flank. Furthermore, by the terms of Metaxas' proposal, the Allies would lose access to the ports of Katerini and Volos.

While Athens tried to maintain a balance between the warring coalitions and defend what remained of the country's neutrality, the Allies imposed a limited embargo on coal and wheat imports and seized Lesbos on 28 December for use as a base of operations. On the same day, three German airplanes bombed British positions in Thessaloniki, after which Sarrail arrested all foreign consuls in the city and detained them on an Allied warship. Allied encroachments on Greek sovereignty continued to gather pace: on 10 January 1916, the Allied ambassadors announced that the Serbian troops would be ferried from Albania to the Greek island of Corfu, which was seized by French troops on the next day. In order to impede a possible Bulgarian advance, on 12 January, Sarrail ordered several railway bridges blown up, and on 28 January, French troops seized the Karabournou Fortress to control the entry to the Thermaic Gulf. Both steps were taken without the agreement of the Greek authorities or even consultation with General Mahon, but enraged Greek public opinion, which began to turn against the Allies.

The whole series of events in the winter of 1915/1916 was indicative of the hopeless legal and political imbroglio that the Greek government found itself. This was now firmly in the hands of the anti-Venizelist faction, as Venizelos and his supporters boycotted the elections of 19 December. The already tense political situation in Greece was worsened by the active propaganda carried out by the warring coalitions, with the Central Powers stoking resentment at heavy-handed Allied actions, and the Allies urging Greece to side with them against its traditional rivals, the Bulgarians and the Turks. As the original guarantor powers of Greece, Britain, France, and Russia further claimed a right to intervene as the Greek government had violated both the alliance with Serbia and the Greek constitution by organizing what the Allies (and the Venizelists) regarded as illegal elections.

The mistrust between Sarrail and the Greek government was evident on 23 February when he visited King Constantine and Skouloudis to explain his unilateral actions in Macedonia. By that time, 133,000 Serbian soldiers had been evacuated to Corfu. Over 3,000 died of dysentery and typhus during their stay there, but they were also re-equipped with French arms and formed into six divisions. The Allies planned to move them to Macedonia, and consequently, on 5 April, they demanded that they be moved by ship to Patras and thence overland by rail, via Athens and Larissa, to Thessaloniki. Skouloudis vehemently rejected this request, and a heated quarrel with the French ambassador ensued. The breach between the Greek and Allied governments was further deepened when the French rejected a request for a 150 million Franc loan on 23 April, only for Athens to agree to a similar loan from Germany instead.

=== Onset of hostilities in Macedonia and the surrender of Rupel ===
In the event, the Serbian army was moved by ship to Macedonia, where it was grouped into three field armies. The addition of the 130,000 Serbs gave the Allies over 300,000 men in Macedonia, raising the prospect of an Allied offensive that might draw Romania into the war on the Allied side. This was delayed as the demands placed by the ongoing Battle of Verdun on the Western Front did not allow the transfer of more troops to Macedonia, but conversely, the Allies sought to tie down German and Austrian forces that had begun to withdraw in Macedonia. As a result, on 12 March 1916, the Allied forces exited the Salonica camp and approached the Greek frontier, where they came into contact with Central Powers forces.

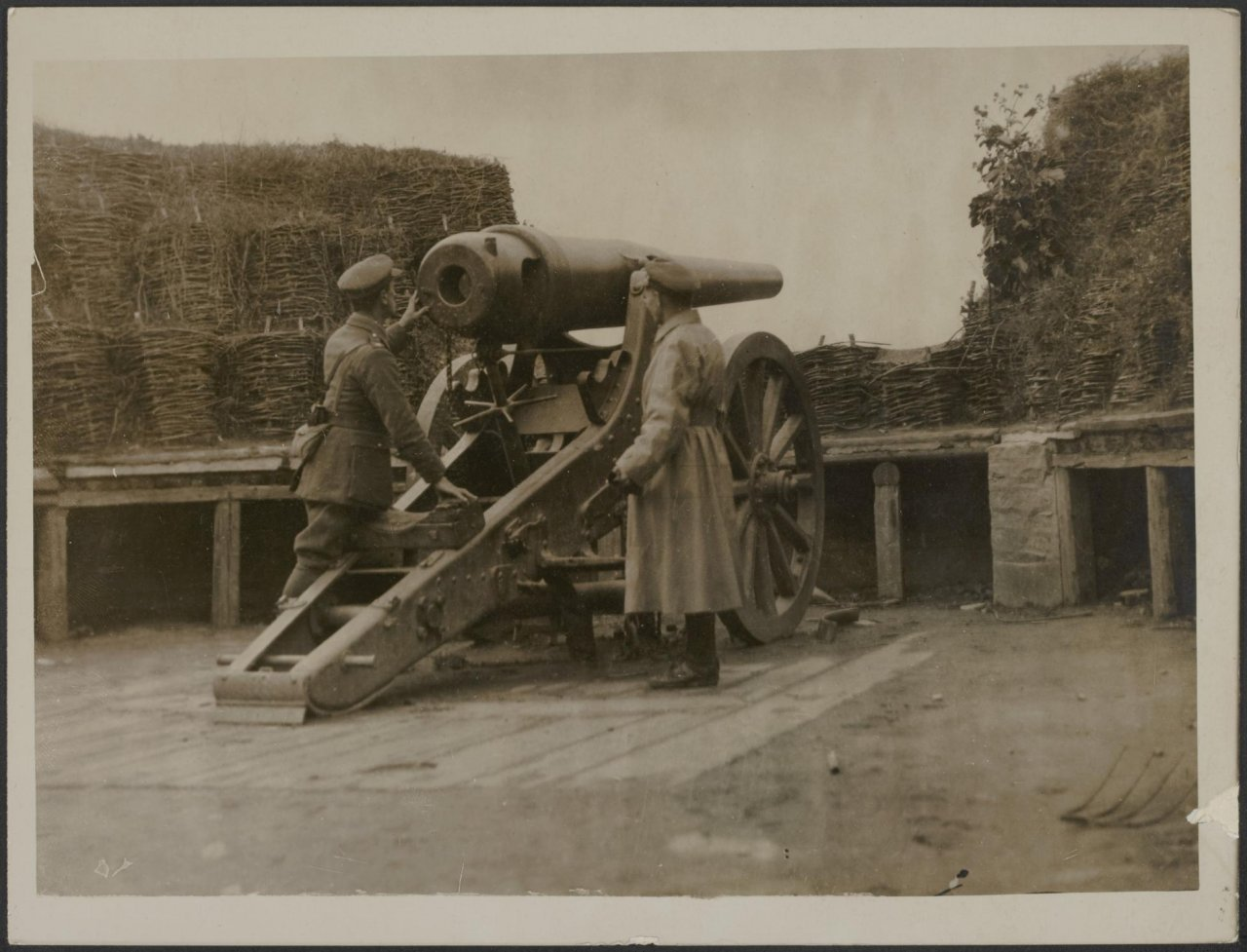
A heavy Greek gun at Dova Tepe

On 14 March, Falkenhayn informed the Greek government that German-Bulgarian troops would advance up to Neo Petritsi. The Ministry of Military affairs immediately issued orders for all covering forces to be withdrawn so as to avoid contact with the German–Bulgarian forces. If the latter targeted Greek forts, the latter had to be evacuated and their armament destroyed. However, on 10 May, this order was rescinded as the government feared lest the Bulgarians take advantage of it unilaterally, and the Greek forces were ordered to oppose with arms any incursion of more than 500m into Greek soil.

On the same day, two events of major importance occurred. First, French battalions seized the Greek fort of Dova Tepe, located between lakes Doiran and Kerkini. The garrison provided no resistance, in accordance with its instructions. In the wake of this, the Greek forces evacuated the area from the Vardar to Dova Tepe. As a result, the Greek forces found themselves in two widely separate concentrations: V Corps (8th, 9th, 15th Divisions) and IV Corps (5th, 6th, 7th Divisions) in eastern Macedonia, and III Corps (10th, 11th, 12th Divisions) and the Greek forces in Thessaly to the west. Second, the Germans notified Athens that they wanted to occupy the Rupel Pass, east of Lake Kerkini, in response to the Allies' crossing the Strymon River. The Greek government protested that this was not the case, but on 22 May 1916, the Bulgarian and German governments formally notified Athens of their intention to occupy Rupel.

On 26 May, the garrison of the Rupel Fortress detected approaching German-Bulgarian columns. Its commander, Major Ioannis Mavroudis, after notifying his superiors (6th Division and Thessaloniki Fortress Command), informed the approaching Germans of his orders to resist. The 6th Division commander, Major General Andreas Bairas, mobilized his forces and issued orders to resist any attack, while sending word to Athens, IV Corps, and notifying the Allied forces that had advanced up to the village of Strymoniko (about 40 kilometres (25 mi) to the south) for possible assistance. Despite repeated warnings that they would resist any attempt to seize Rupel and that Athens had been notified, three German-Bulgarian columns moved to capture Mount Kerkini, Mount Angistro, and the bridge over the Strymon at Koula, until Mavroudis ordered his guns to open fire upon them. They then halted and withdrew back over the border. However, at 15:05, orders arrived from Athens mandating the withdrawal of Greek covering forces without resistance. At Rupel, Mavroudis still refused to surrender the fort without explicit instructions, until Athens authorized his withdrawal. The fort was surrendered and the garrison withdrew on 27 May, allowing the German-Bulgarian forces unimpeded access to the Strymon valley and eastern Macedonia.

=== Martial law in Thessaloniki, Greek demobilization and the Zaimis government ===
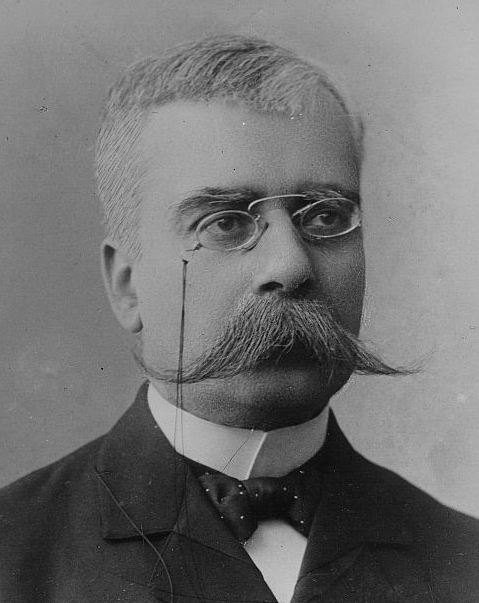
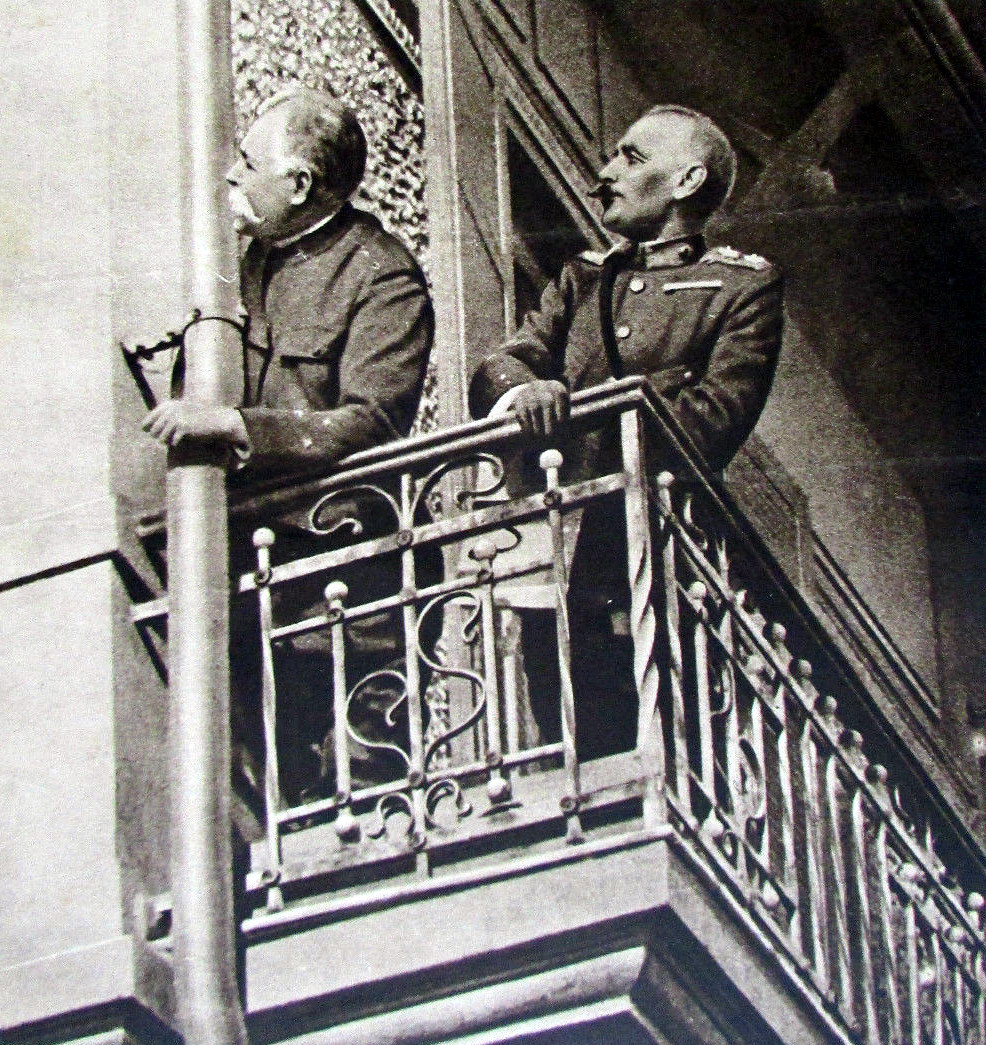
The new Greek Prime Minister Alexandros Zaimis; Generals Sarrail (left) and Moschopoulos (right) watch the French anti-aircraft batteries shooting at Aviatik bombers over Thessaloniki

The surrender of Rupel was a shock to Greek public opinion and a catalyst for the relations between Greece and the Allies: on 3 June, while the Greek authorities were celebrating King Constantine's birthday in Thessaloniki, Sarrail imposed martial law in the city, occupying the customs, telegraph and post offices and the railways, and imposing a strict censorship regime on the press. A number of senior Greek officers, including the heads of the Greek Gendarmerie's Macedonia command and the city's police, were expelled. Lt. General Moschopoulos took over their positions, as the senior official representative of the Greek government in the city.

Furthermore, on 6 June, a formal, albeit partial, blockade against Greece was imposed by the Allies. Greek ships were liable to be stopped and searched, while those in Allied harbours were detained in port. The French also took over control of the Thessaloniki harbour. The Greek government's protests, which extended to neutral countries, including the United States, were regarded by the Allies as a hostile gesture. The French played the leading role in these events, led by Sarrail and ambassador Jean Guillemin, who pressed for no less than the overthrow of King Constantine, while the British opposed such extreme measures.

On 8 June, in an effort to reduce the financial burden on the state and appease Sarrail's suspicions about a stab in the back, Athens decided to begin the demobilization of the Greek army: 12 older classes were demobilized entirely, while a two-month furlough was given to those hailing from southern Greece. This was not enough, and on 21 June, the Allied ambassadors demanded the complete demobilization of the army, the resignation of the government, and new elections. Informed in advance of these demands, Skouloudis had already resigned and King Constantine entrusted the veteran politician Alexandros Zaimis with forming a government and satisfying the Allied demands. Elections were proclaimed for 8 October, the army was demobilized, and even a few police officers whose dismissal had been requested were replaced.

The complete acceptance of the Allied demands by Athens did not prevent Sarrail from trying further provocations: in late June, he demanded to be given command of the Greek Gendarmerie in his zone of operations; when this was refused, the French general demanded the immediate departure of all Greek forces from Thessaloniki before backing down. In mid-July, a French-controlled newspaper published articles insulting the King and the Greek officer corps. Its editor was beaten up by Greek officers, who were then arrested by Moschopoulos, but Sarrail, who claimed that this was an insult to the French flag, sent an armed detachment to seize them and try them in a French court-martial. The Greek government eventually secured their return and regular trial by Greek authorities. At the same time, the royalists also began organizing against a potential threat to the throne: demobilized officers and soldiers were organized in the "Reservist Associations".

=== Central Powers offensives and the Bulgarian invasion of eastern Macedonia ===
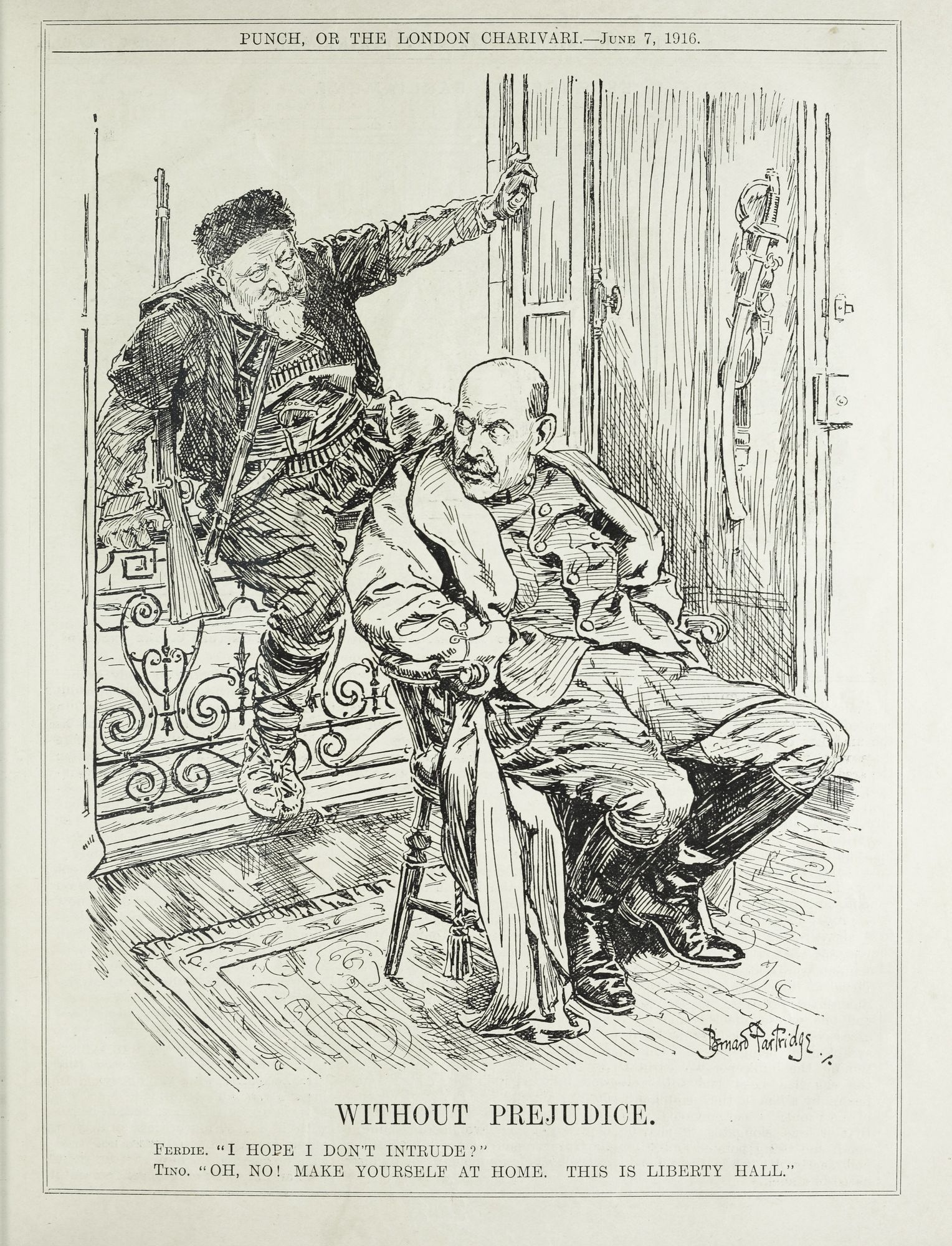
Punch cartoon chastising King Constantine for his inaction during the Bulgarian invasion of Macedonia, represented by King Ferdinand entering through the window.

The long-planned Allied offensive in what was now the Macedonian front had been delayed for 20 August, but on 17 August, the German and Bulgarian forces attacked the Serbian positions north of Florina, which they captured on the same night. The Central Powers' advance continued in the west, where they clashed not only with the Serbians around Kajmakčalan, but also with the Greek 18th Infantry Regiment, as well as in eastern Macedonia, where Bulgarian forces crossed the Nestos river at Chrysoupolis, and approached Kavala. This led the Allies to cross the Strymon as well, but their first attacks were held by the Bulgarians.

The Zaimis government, on the other hand, made an offer to the Allies of entering the war in exchange for financial support and a guarantee regarding the country's territorial integrity. It received no answer, and as a result, the government decided not to offer resistance to the Bulgarian advance in eastern Macedonia, where the Greek position was precarious: following demobilization, IV Corps was left with c. 600 officers and 8,500 men, headed by the 7th Division commander, Colonel Ioannis Hatzopoulos, while the fortifications of the Kavala Fortress area had not been completed. On 15 August, Athens ordered the Kavala Fortress command to dismantle its artillery and machine guns, while on 18 August, orders were given to all divisional commands to avoid clashes and withdraw their units to the divisional bases, and that the cities, including Serres and Drama, were to be abandoned, if necessary, and the available troops to retreat to Kavala. As the Bulgarian advance continued, sporadic clashes erupted in places, while elsewhere Greek units, such as the 18th Regiment and the 5th Division, were encircled and disarmed. One by one, Hatzopoulos lost contact with IV Corps' units and forts, while such units headed for Kavala, accompanied by the civilian population, which fled the Bulgarian advance and the atrocities of irregular komitadjis. Hatzopoulos' requests to be allowed to mobilize reserves and receive reinforcements from the fleet were denied. By 22 August, eastern Macedonia was effectively under Bulgarian occupation.

On 23 August, the Allies announced a blockade of Kavala harbour. Over the same day and that following, the Bulgarians encircled the city and occupied the ring of fortresses around it. The 5th Division remained at Drama, but the 6th Division, except for its 16th Regiment (which remained at Serres), managed to reach Kavala on 4 September. Only after 27 August, through German intervention, was the resupply of the isolated Greek garrisons allowed, which led to the relaxing of the Allied blockade as well.

== Two Greek governments, September 1916 – June 1917 ==
On 27 August, Romania entered the war on the Allied side. The event laid bare the deepening "National Schism" engulfing Greek society. On the same day, a large Venizelist rally was held at Athens, with Venizelos as the main speaker. In his speech, Venizelos accused King Constantine of pro-German sentiments, and publicly announced that he was forced to oppose him. Two days later on 29 August, the anti-Venizelist and pro-neutral camp held its own rally, where the former prime ministers Gounaris, Rallis, Dragoumis, as well as the head of the Reservists, fiercely denounced Venizelos as an agent of foreign powers.

=== The National Defence uprising and the surrender of IV Corps ===
Already since late 1915, Venizelist officers in Thessaloniki, led by 10th Division commander Leonidas Paraskevopoulos, 11th Division commander Emmanouil Zymvrakakis and the Lt. Colonel Konstantinos Mazarakis, and with the encouragement and support of Sarrail, had been engaged in a conspiracy to foment a revolt among the Greek military forces in Macedonia and lead them into war against Bulgaria. On 30 August, a "Committee of National Defence" (Ἐπιτροπή Ἐθνικής Ἀμύνης) announced its existence and called for a revolt. The uprising gained the support of the Gendarmerie and a large part of the populace, armed by the French and backed by French troops and armoured cars. The regular Greek military units mostly proved loyal to the government, but Moschopoulos' deputy, Colonel Nikolaos Trikoupis, sought to avoid bloodshed and a direct confrontation with the Allies. By nightfall of 31 August, the Greek soldiers had surrendered, and Trikoupis with the loyal officers was on board a French steamship bound for Piraeus.

The events in Thessaloniki made an adverse impression in southern Greece, and the returning officers were given a heroes' welcome. Even Venizelos and many of his leading supporters condemned it as illegal and premature. In Thessaloniki too, the establishment of the new regime, headed by Zymvrakakis, proved difficult, due to the reluctance of the people and the officer corps to support it. However, within a few days they were joined by other uprisings led by local politicians at Chania, Herakleion, and Samos; in all cases, the loyalist officers were expelled and the entry of Greece into the war on the side of the Allies demanded.

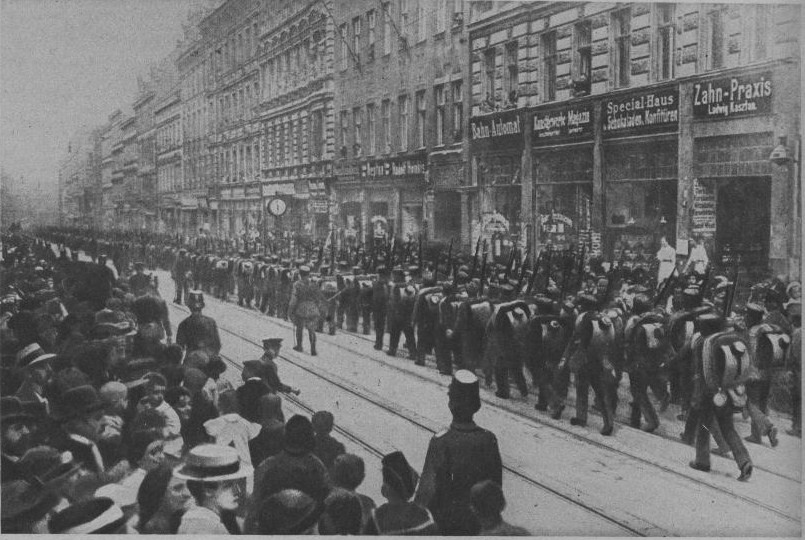
The men of IV Corps march through the streets of Görlitz

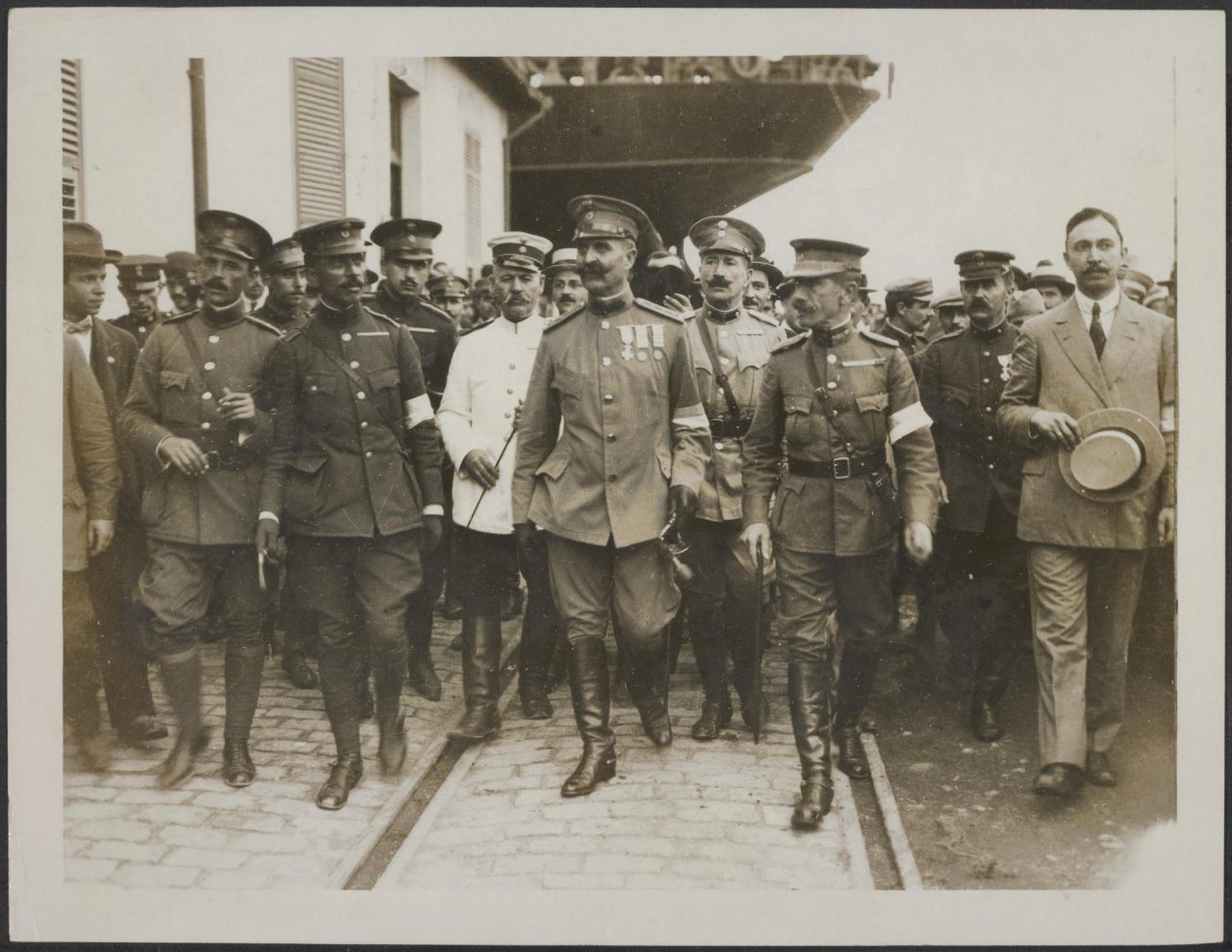
Colonel Christodoulou (centre) is welcomed to Thessaloniki by Major General Zymvrakakis (third from right) and other members of the National Defence

In eastern Macedonia, the remnants of IV Corps were still isolated from one another and surrounded by Bulgarian forces. Officers who had left from Kavala for Thessaloniki were sent back to urge the 6th Division to join the uprising: on 5 September, they met with the divisional commander, Colonel Nikolaos Christodoulou, who agreed to board his unit on Allied ships and join the National Defence in Thessaloniki. On the next day, the Bulgarians demanded to occupy the heights north of Kavala, leaving the city entirely defenceless. On 9 September, Hatzopoulos thwarted an attempt to embark his units on Allied ships; only a handful sailed for Thasos. On the next day, however, he was confronted by German demands to concentrate his forces inland at Drama. As this amounted to capture by the Bulgarians, he played for time and proposed that his forces were instead transported to Germany. A war council of his commanders, however, decided to approach the Allies with the intention of transferring the troops to southern Greece. During the same night, embarkation resumed in great disorder, but when Hatzopoulos himself approached a British vessel, a representative of the National Defence informed him that the ship's captain demanded a pledge of support to the Thessaloniki regime before he could be allowed on board. Refusing, Hatzopoulos returned to Kavala where complete chaos reigned; those who could embark did so, the prisons were thrown open, and widespread looting occurred.

On the morning of the next day, the Germans informed Hatzopoulos that they agreed to accept to move the IV Corps to Germany, where they would be interned as "guests" rather than prisoners of war, with their personal weapons. However, the Germans insisted that the entire force had to move north and leave Kavala on the same day. On the same day, the government in Athens finally realized that events in Kavala had taken a course contrary to the German and Bulgarian assurances. Its orders to seek embarkation by all means possible, including on Allied ships, and rescue as many of the men and material as possible, arrived at Kavala at 21:00. It was too late; most of the units still under Hatzopoulos' command—over 400 officers and 6,000 other ranks—were moving north into territory held by the Bulgarians, arriving at Drama on 12 September. Most of the material was left behind and eventually taken over by the Bulgarians. Between 15–27 September, Hatzopoulos and his men were moved by train to Görlitz in Germany, where they remained until the end of the war. About 2,000 men of the 6th Division, under Col. Christodoulou, as well as a battalion of the 2/21 Cretan Regiment and the bulk of the 7th Field Artillery Regiment managed to escape to Thasos, where Christodoulou managed to rally the majority into supporting the National Defence Committee. The rest, including most of the 7th Field Artillery Regiment, remained loyal to the King and were transported to southern Greece. The guns and equipment of the 7th Field Artillery Regiment, however, were intercepted en route by a French warship and redirected to Thessaloniki.

In Thessaloniki, the National Defence Committee formed Christodoulou's men, along with the few troops to join the uprising in Thessaloniki, into the "1st National Defence Battalion", which was sent to the Strymon front on 28 September, while the Athens government, ordered all its forces to withdraw to Thessaly. Major General Paraskevopoulos was named commander of III Corps (Moschopoulos had been recalled to Athens to become chief of the Army Staff Service) to oversee the operation. Paraskevopoulos disobeyed, and remained at Katerini where the 4/41 Evzone Regiment was based, with the intention of joining the National Defence; likewise, in Veroia, Venizelist officers rose up and declared themselves for the National Defence Committee and against the King's government. The Bulgarian occupation of eastern Macedonia, accompanied by reports of atrocities, and the surrender of IV Corps, enraged Greek public opinion, but only served to deepen its division; the pro-Venizelos faction regarded this as one more incentive for entering the war on the Allied side, while the pro-neutral side put the blame on the Allies' presence in Macedonia. As for the Allies, they considered the entire sequence of affairs an elaborate deception staged by the royalist Greek government in concert with the Central Powers.

=== Greek evacuation of Northern Epirus, the collapse of Romania, and consolidation of the Macedonian Front ===
The Bulgarian advance in the Florina area was reversed after the Allied offensive which began on 12 September, but it had led to rumours that they would join with the Greek forces in Thessaly to attack the Allied forces from the rear. Given the Allies' heavy distrust towards Athens, the Italian government seized upon these rumours to advocate for the expulsion of the Greek forces from southern Albania. This area, known to Greeks as Northern Epirus, had been claimed by Greece due to its large ethnic Greek population and the fact that it had been captured during the Balkan Wars. It had been assigned to Albania in the 1913 Treaty of London, but the Greek army had re-occupied it, with Allied consent, in late 1914; at the same time Italy had seized the area around the port of Valona, in order to guard against an Austrian invasion of northern Albania. The Greek forces in the area, 16th Division under V Corps, had been scaled down considerably following the June demobilization, and its commander, Major General Georgios Mavrogiannis, was unable to offer any effective resistance. Tepelenë was captured by the Italians on 30 August, and the rest of Northern Epirus followed in October: the Italians landed at Sarandë on 2 October and occupied the eastern part of the region around Gjirokastër, while the French occupied the western half around Korçë.

During the autumn, the military situation in the Balkans developed rapidly. During September–December, the Romanian army was defeated and almost the entire country occupied by the Central Powers. On the other hand, the Allies had some successes in the Macedonian front, pushing the Bulgarian forces back in several places, before the front stabilized during the winter. Thereafter both sides settled in into relatively static trench warfare across a 350 km wide front from the mountains of Albania to the Strymon River. Sarrail's Allied Army of the Orient was increased to 450,000 men during the same period; a multinational force comprising British, French, Serbian, Italian, Russian, and Greek units, it was hampered by poor supply lines and the complications of Allied politics. On the other side, the front was held mostly by the Bulgarian army, backed by a few German and Ottoman battalions; the German high command was content to follow a defensive stance in Macedonia.

=== Establishment of the State of National Defence ===
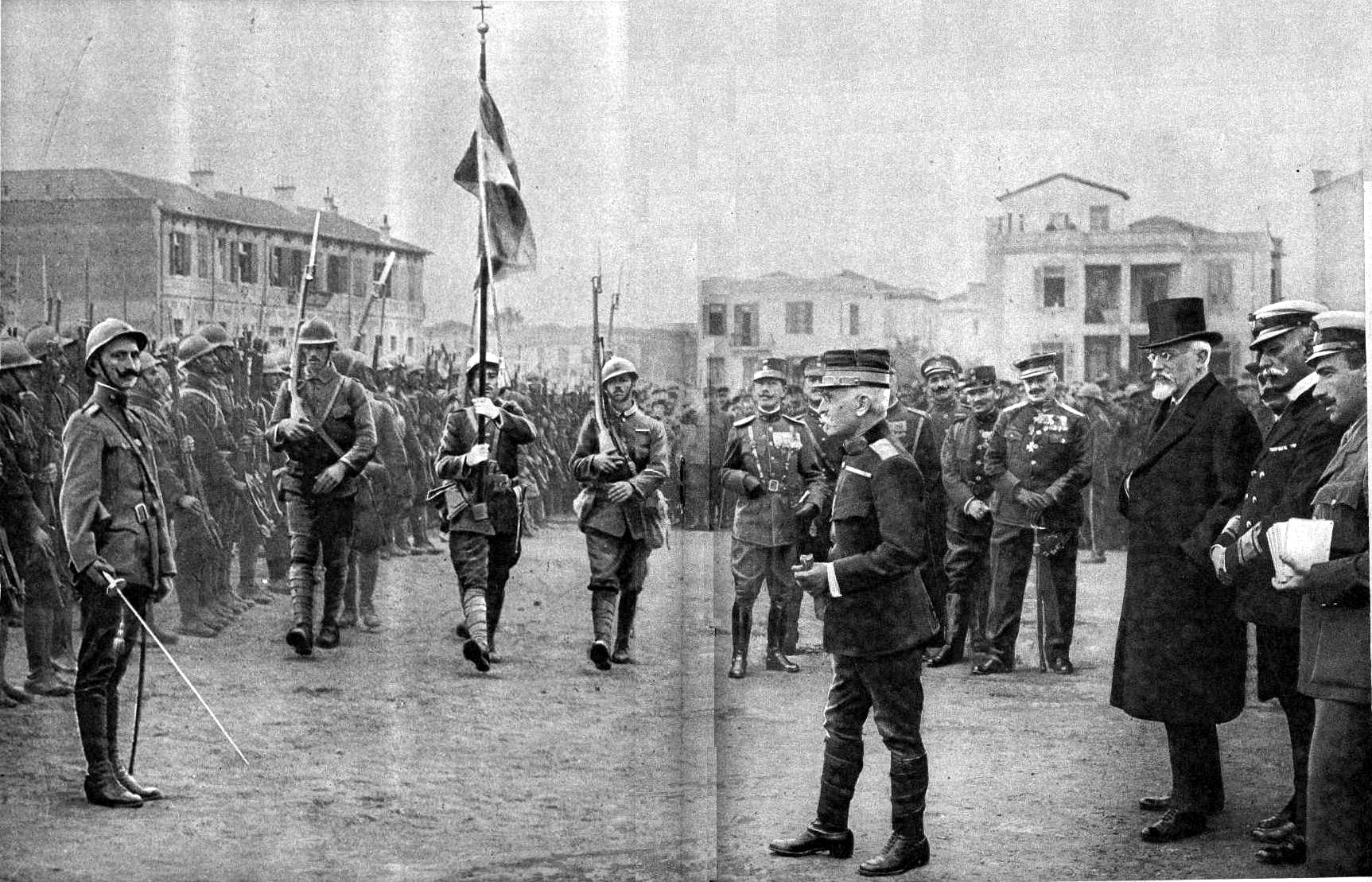
The triumvirate of the National Defence government, Venizelos, General Panagiotis Danglis and Admiral Pavlos Kountouriotis, at the presentation of the regimental flags for the first units raised by the revolutionary regime to fight in the Macedonian front

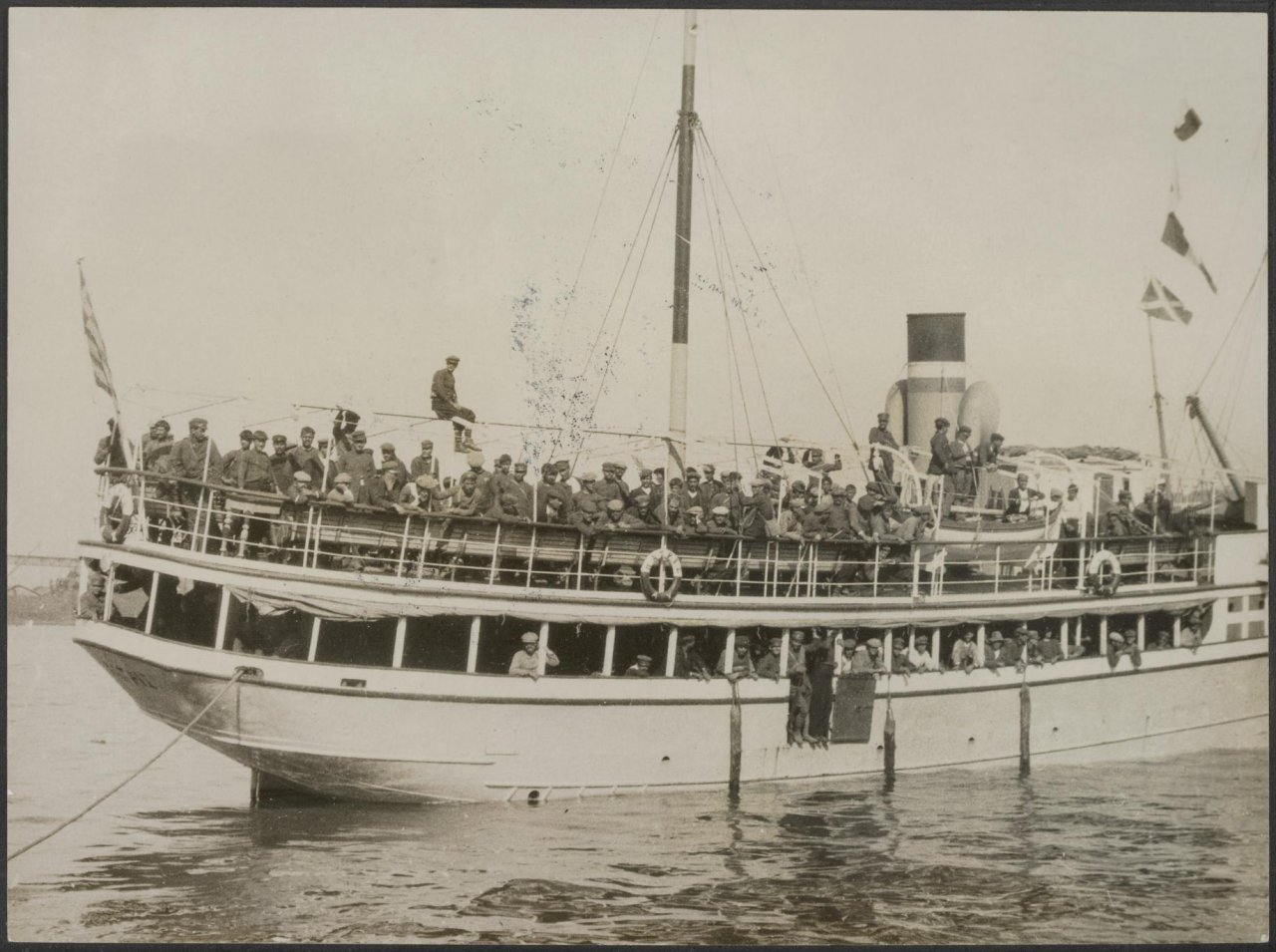
Greek volunteers arrive in Thessaloniki

Despite Greece remaining officially neutral, by September 1916 the country was effectively a battleground in the war. The Bulgarians occupied eastern Macedonia, while relations with the Allies were marked by deep hostility and mistrust. After repeated calls from Thessaloniki, on 25 September, Venizelos, accompanied by many of his followers, sailed to Chania in his home island of Crete, with the intention of forming a revolutionary government. Although Venizelos stressed that his initiative served national rather than narrow party interests it was welcomed in Crete and the islands of the eastern Aegean, which had been only recently seized during the Balkan Wars (when Venizelos had been prime Minister), but found few supporters in "Old Greece", the pre-1912 territory of the kingdom. Venizelos was joined by two respected military figures, Admiral Pavlos Kountouriotis and Lt. General Panagiotis Danglis, in the so-called "triumvirate" (τριανδρία). Together they landed at Thessaloniki on 9 October, and formed the Provisional Government of National Defence. Soon recognized by the Allies, the new regime declared war on Germany and Bulgaria on 23 October and 24 October respectively.

Entente and Venizelist efforts to persuade the "official" royal government in Athens to abandon its neutrality and join them failed, and relations irreparably broke down during the Noemvriana, when Entente and Venizelist troops clashed with royalists in the streets of the Greek capital. The royalist officers of the Hellenic Army were cashiered, and troops were conscripted to fight under Venizelist officers, as was the case with the Royal Hellenic Navy. Still, King Constantine, who enjoyed the protection of the Russian Tsar as a relative and fellow monarch, could not be removed until after the February Revolution in Russia removed the Russian monarchy from the picture. In June 1917, King Constantine abdicated from the throne, and his second son, Alexander, assumed the throne as king (despite the wishes of most Venizelists to declare a Republic). Venizelos assumed control of the entire country, while royalists and other political opponents of Venizelos were exiled or imprisoned. Greece, by now united under a single government, officially declared war against the Central Powers on 30 June 1917 and would eventually raise 10 divisions for the Entente effort, alongside the Royal Hellenic Navy.

== Greece on the side of the Allies, June 1917 – November 1918 ==
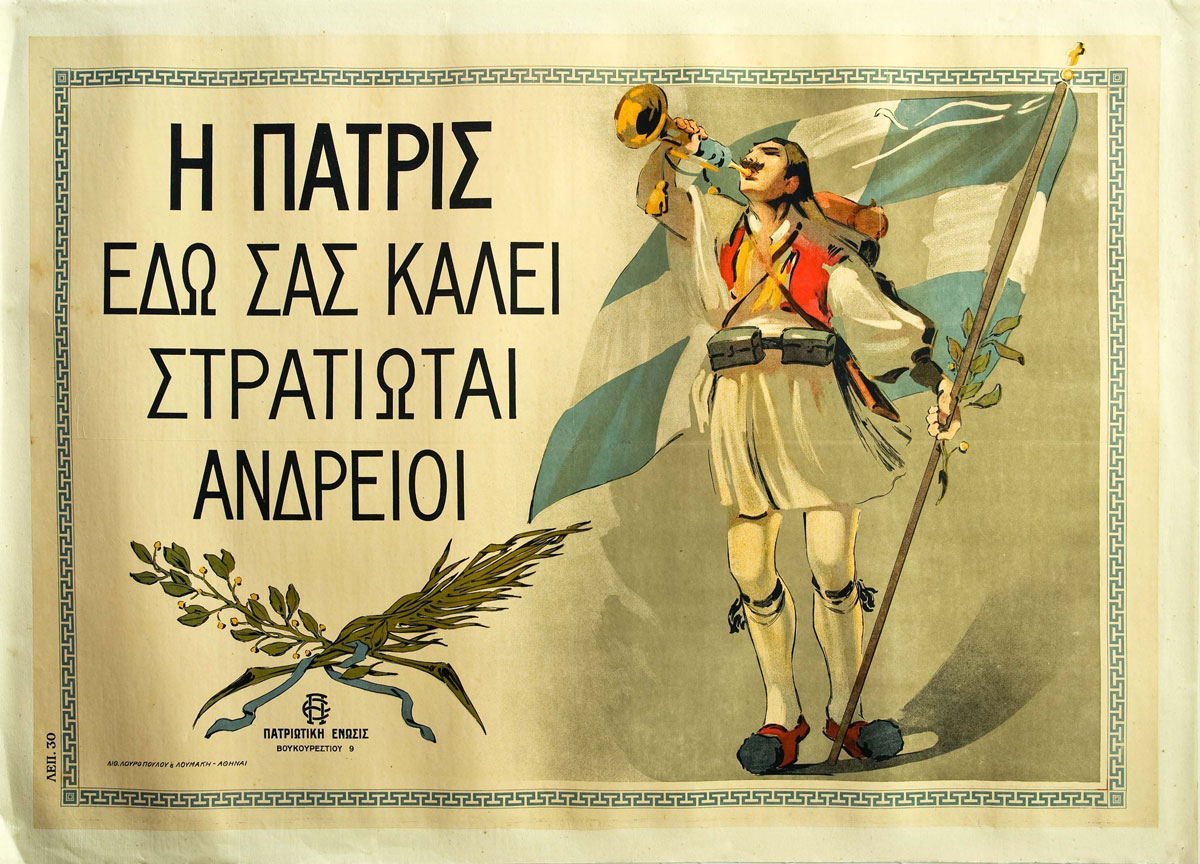
Greek war poster

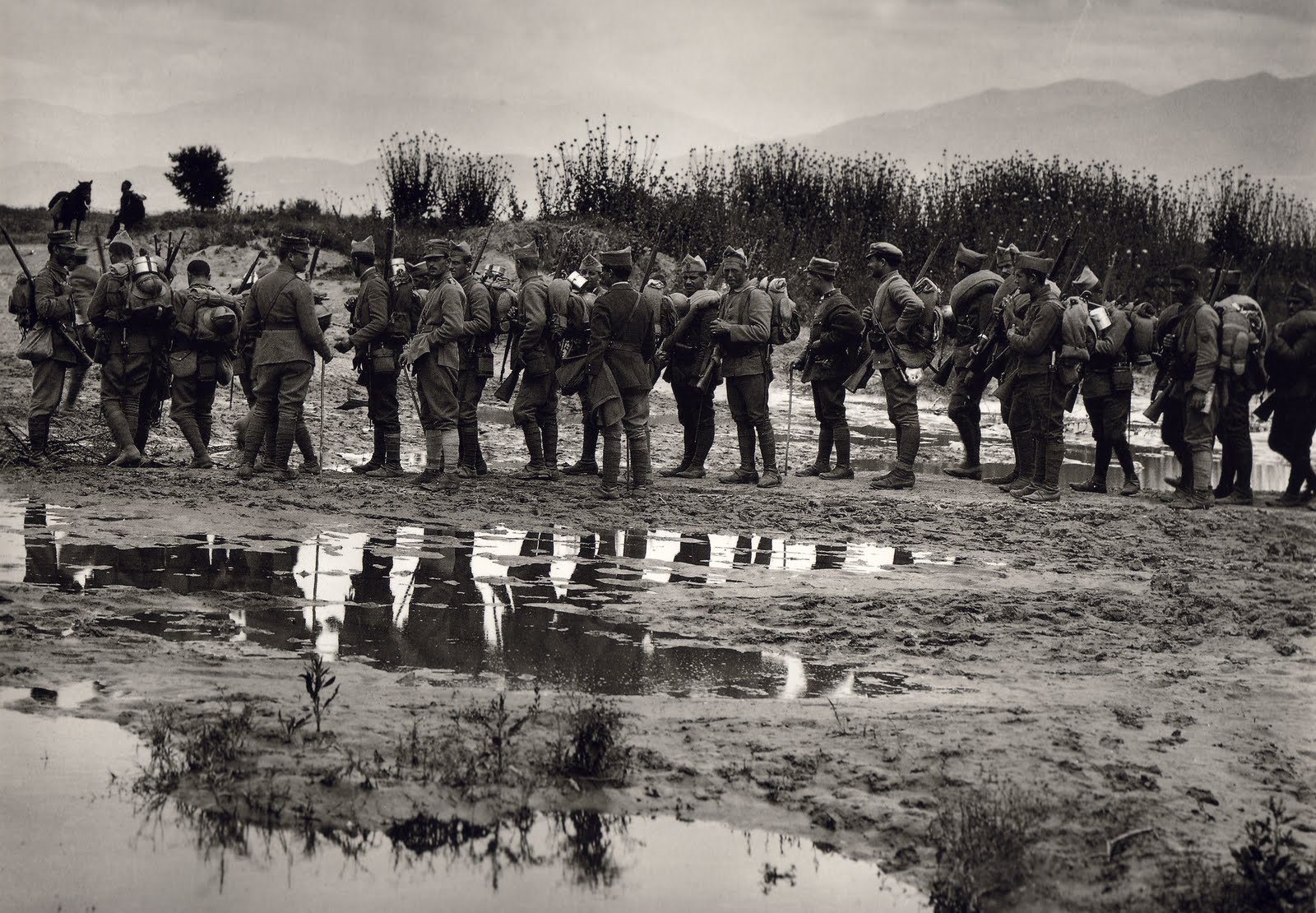
Hellenic Army at Strymon river, 1917

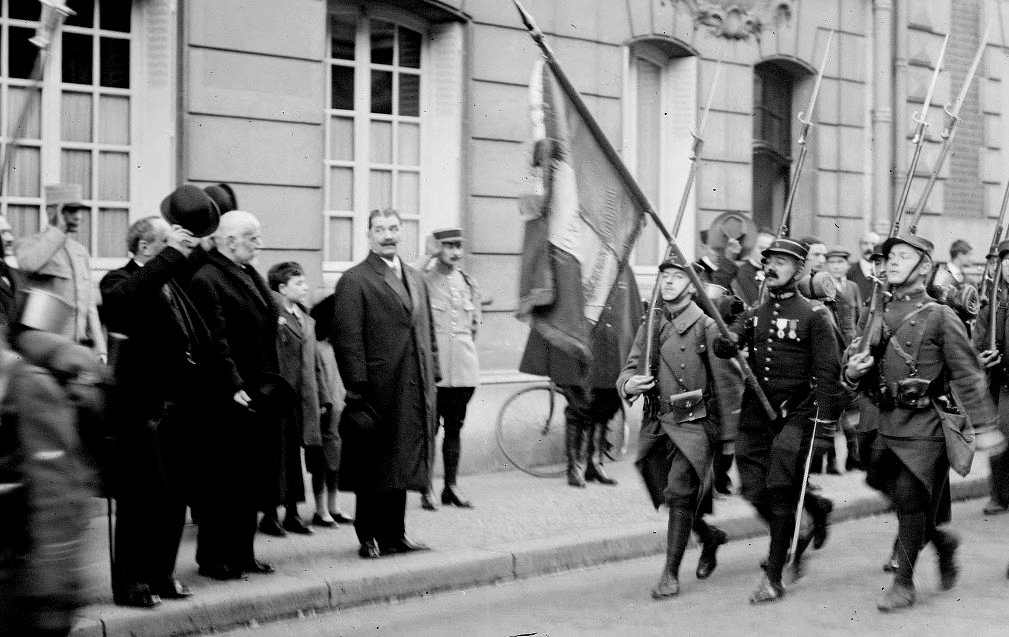
Prime Minister Venizelos in Paris during the war (1917)

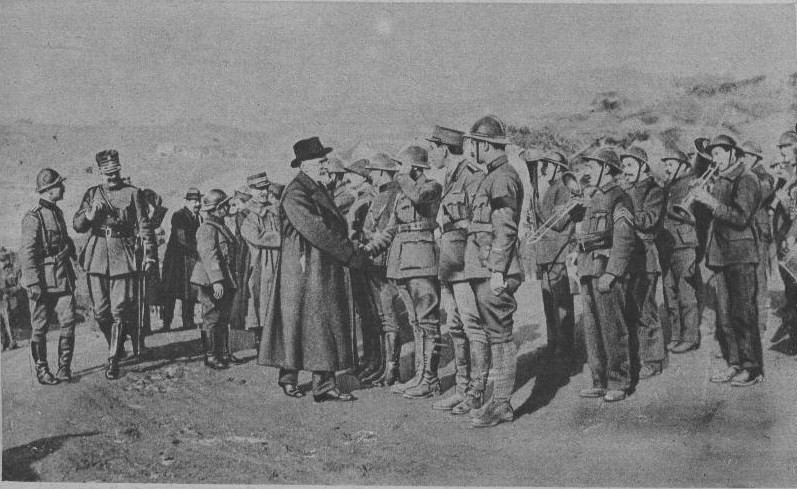
Venizelos inspects units at the Macedonian front, 1918

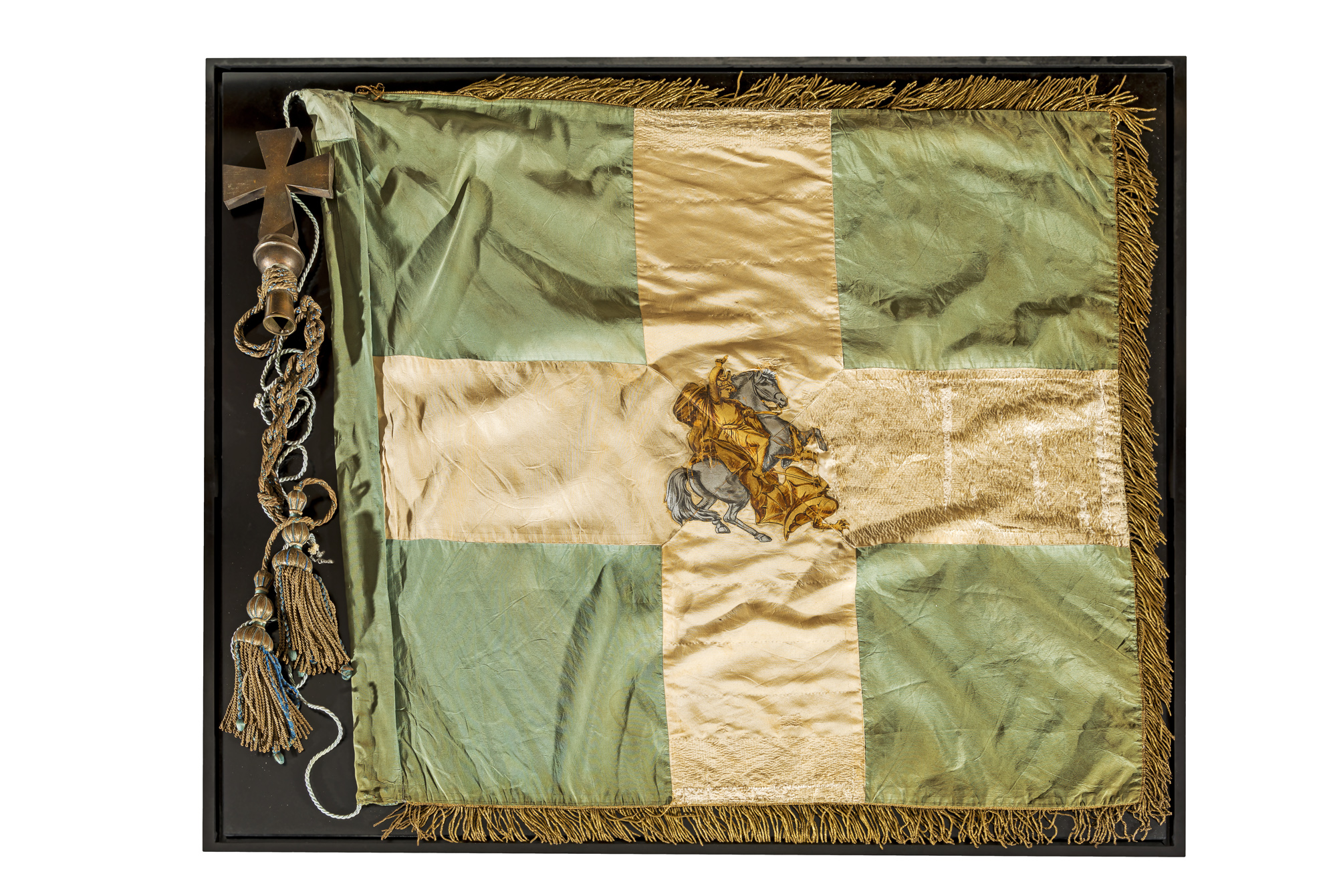
The Greek military flag used during the Victory Parade in Arc de Triomphe.

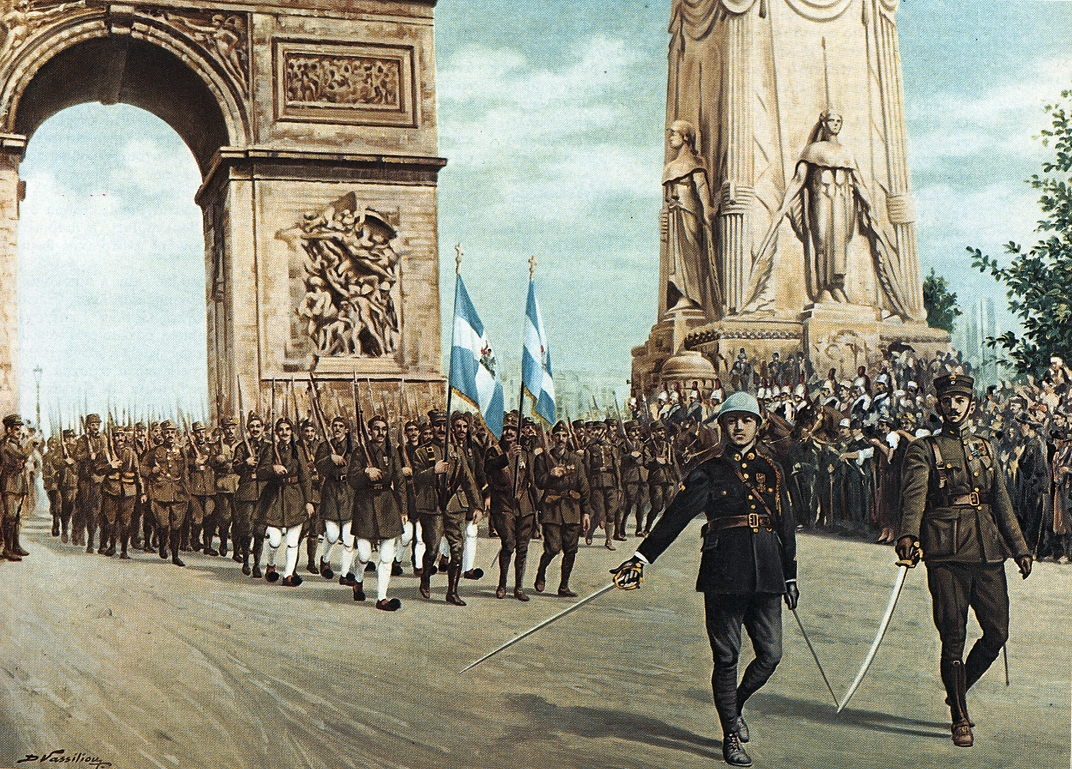
Greek military formation in the World War I victory parade in Arc de Triomphe, Paris, July 1919.

The Macedonian front stayed mostly stable throughout the war. In May 1918, Greek forces attacked Bulgarian forces and defeated them at the Battle of Skra-di-Legen on 30 May 1918. Later in 1918, the Allied forces drove their offensive from Greece into occupied Serbia. In September of that year, Allied forces (French, Greek, Serb, Italian, and British troops), under the command of French general Louis Franchet d'Espèrey, broke through the German, Austro-Hungarian, and Bulgarian lines along the Macedonian front. Bulgaria later signed the Armistice of Salonica with the Allies in Thessaloniki on 29 September 1918. By October, the Allies-including the Greeks under Franchet d'Espèrey, had re-taken all of Serbia and were ready to invade Hungary when Hungarian authorities offered surrender.

The Greek military suffered an estimated 5,000 deaths from their nine divisions that participated in the war. The total casualties exceeded 24,000 men.

== After the war ==
As Greece emerged victorious from World War I, it was rewarded with territorial acquisitions, specifically Western Thrace (Treaty of Neuilly-sur-Seine) and Eastern Thrace and the Smyrna area (Treaty of Sèvres). Greek gains were largely undone by the subsequent Greco-Turkish War of 1919 to 1922.

== See also ==
- Diplomatic history of World War I § Greece
- Megali Idea
- The Chanak Crisis

== Sources ==
- Abbott, G. F. (2008). Greece and the Allies 1914–1922. London: Methuen & co. ltd. ISBN 978-0-554-39462-6.
- Clogg, R. (2002). A Concise History of Greece. London: Cambridge University Press. ISBN 0-521-00479-9.
- Dutton, D. (1998). The Politics of Diplomacy: Britain and France in the Balkans in the First World War. I.B. Tauris. ISBN 978-1-86064-079-7.
- Falls, Cyril Bentham (1933). Military Operations Macedonia. From the Outbreak of War to the Spring of 1917. History of the Great War based on Official Documents. London: His Majesty’s Stationery Office.
- Falls, Cyril Bentham (1935). Military Operations Macedonia. From the Spring of 1917 to the End of the War. History of the Great War based on Official Documents. London: His Majesty’s Stationery Office.
- Fotakis, Z. (2005). Greek naval strategy and policy, 1910–1919. London: Routledge. ISBN 978-0-415-35014-3.
- Kitromilides, P. (2006). Eleftherios Venizelos: The Trials of Statesmanship. Edinburgh: Edinburgh University Press. ISBN 0-7486-2478-3.
- Επίτομη ιστορία της συμμετοχής του Ελληνικού Στρατού στον Πρώτο Παγκόσμιο Πόλεμο 1914–1918 [Concise History of the Hellenic Army's Participation in the First World War 1914–1918] (in Greek). Athens: Hellenic Army History Directorate. 1993.
- Kaloudis, George. "Greece and the Road to World War I: To What End?." International Journal on World Peace 31.4 (2014): 9+.
- Leon, George B. Greece and the First World War: from neutrality to intervention, 1917–1918 (East European Monographs, 1990)
- Leontaritis, Georgios; Oikonomou, Nikolaos & Despotopoulos, Alexandros (1978). "Ἡ Ἑλλάς καὶ ὁ Α′ Παγκόσμιος Πόλεμος" [Greece and World War I]. In Christopoulos, Georgios A. & Bastias, Ioannis K. (eds.). Ιστορία του Ελληνικού Έθνους [History of the Greek Nation] (in Greek). Vol. ΙΕ: Νεώτερος Ελληνισμός από το 1913 έως το 1941 [Modern Hellenism from 1913 to 1941]. Athens: Ekdotiki Athinon. pp. 15–73. ISBN 978-960-213-111-4.
- Leontaritis, Georgios (1978). "Οἰκονομία καὶ κοινωνία ἀπὸ τὸ 1914 ὥς τὸ 1918" [Economy and Society from 1914 to 1918]. In Christopoulos, Georgios A. & Bastias, Ioannis K. (eds.). Ιστορία του Ελληνικού Έθνους [History of the Greek Nation] (in Greek). Vol. ΙΕ: Νεώτερος Ελληνισμός από το 1913 έως το 1941 [Modern Hellenism from 1913 to 1941]. Athens: Ekdotiki Athinon. pp. 74–85. ISBN 978-960-213-111-4.
