= 50th Mechanized Infantry Brigade =

50th Mechanized Infantry Brigade "Apsos"
- 50ή Μηχανοκίνητη Ταξιαρχία Πεζικού "ΑΨΟΣ"
- Camp flag of the 50th Mechanized Infantry Brigade
- Active: 1919–1941; 1945–today
- Country: Greece
- Branch: Hellenic Army
- Type: Mechanized infantry
- Size: Brigade
- Part of: IV Army Corps
- Garrison/HQ: Soufli, Evros Prefecture
- Mottos: Courage is the foundation of victory Αρχή του νικάν το θαρρείν Arhi tou nikan to tharin
- Engagements: Greco-Turkish War (1919-1922); World War II: Greco-Italian War; Battle of Greece

The 50th Mechanized Infantry Brigade "Apsos" (Greek: 50ή Μηχανοκίνητη Ταξιαρχία Πεζικού «ΑΨΟΣ», 50 Μ/Κ ΤΑΞ) is a mechanized infantry brigade of the Hellenic Army. It is headquartered in Soufli as part of IV Army Corps.

== History ==
The brigade traces its history to the 50th Infantry Regiment (Greek: 50ό Σύνταγμα Πεζικού, 50 ΣΠ), which was founded in 1919 in Adrianople (now Edirne in Turkey).

The regiment fought in the Greco-Italian War in the Albanian front until the capitulation of the Greek Army following the German invasion of Greece in April 1941. After liberation, the regiment was reformed, initially for a short period as the 32nd Brigade (32η Ταξιαρχία), and stationed at Eleftheroupoli. Between 1964 and 1988 it moved its base from Eleftheroupoli to Feres, Pythio, again to Eleftheroupoli and then briefly to Koufovouno. In summer 1988 it was transferred to Soufli, where its expansion to brigade began.

The 50th Infantry Brigade (50ή Ταξιαρχία Πεζικού) became operational on 1 October 1988, although its formation was not completed until two years later. In September 2000, the formation received the honorific title "Apsos" after the river Osum (Apsos in Greek) in southern Albania, where the 50th Infantry Regiment distinguished itself in battle on 25 January 1941. The brigade was converted to mechanized infantry in 2003, acquiring its present title.

== Emblem ==
The brigade's emblem features a purple triangular shield upon which is depicted a golden sphinx wielding a poleaxe. A scroll underneath the sphinx bears the unit's abbreviated title. The whole is edged in white, with an inscription above with the unit's motto, Αρχή του νικάν το θαρρείν ("Courage is the foundation of victory"), a quote from Plutarch (Life of Themistocles, 8.2) referring to the Battle of Artemisium in 480 BC.

== Structure ==
- Brigade Headquarters Company (Λ/Σ 50 Μ/Κ ΤΑΞ ΠΖ)
- 50th Medium Tank Battalion (50 ΕΜΑ)
- 107th Self-Propelled Artillery-Multiple Rocket Launcher Squadron (107η A/K ΜΜΠ/ΠΕΠ).
- 512th Infantry Battalion (512 ΤΠ)
- 514th Infantry Battalion (514 ΤΠ)
- 558th Motorized Infantry Battalion (558 M/K ΤΠ)
- 640th Motorized Infantry Battalion (640 M/K ΤΠ)
- 50th Support Battalion (50 ΤΥΠ)
- 50th Signals Company (50 ΛΔΒ)
- 50th Engineer Company (50 ΛΜΧ)
- 50th Anti-Tank Company (50 ΛΑΤ)
- 50th Light Anti-Aircraft Artillery Company (50 ΠΕΑ/ΑΠ)
