= Struma operation =

World War I military operation in the Balkans

Coordinates: 40.7858°N 23.8489°E

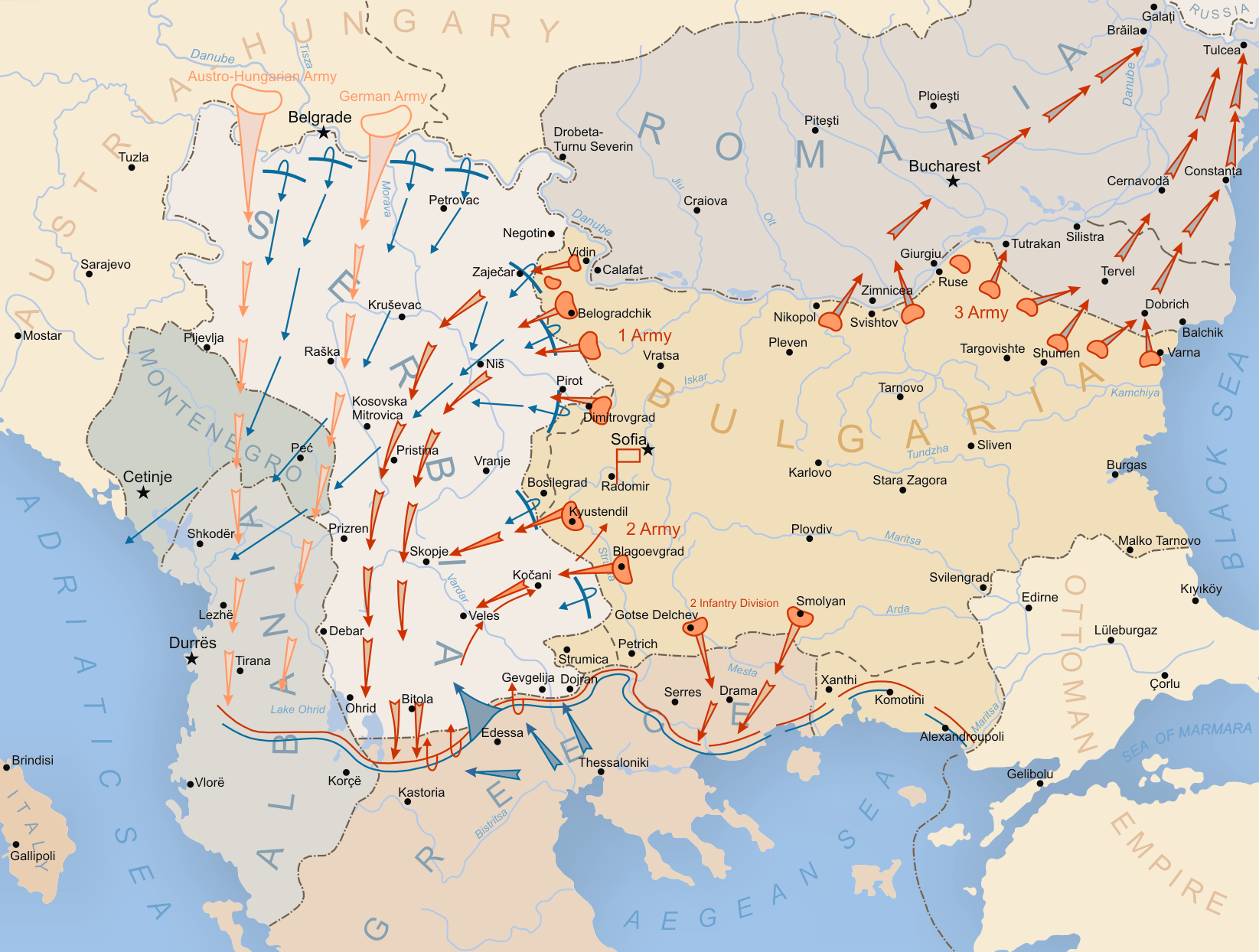
Struma operation (to the south)

The Struma operation was the occupation of a part of northeastern mainland Greece by the Bulgarian army during the First World War between 17–23 August 1916. It was named after the Struma (Strymonas) river.

== Background ==
In August 1916, Romania chose to join the war effort on the side of the Allies. The Allies planned a large offensive in the Macedonian front for the middle of August to support Romania's entry into the war and pin down as many Bulgarian forces as possible. The Bulgarian high command suspected an impending offensive, and the fighting around Doiran that erupted on 9 August only confirmed these suspicions. On their part, the Bulgarians had urged for an offensive in Macedonia since the beginning of the year, now planning a strike with the First Army and Second Army on both Allied flanks.

On the western flank, the Chegan offensive resulted in the conquest of Florina, but the First Army failed to take Chegan (today Agios Athanasios).

The plan on the eastern flank was to seize the Drama-Komotini railway, and this objective was given to the Bulgarian Second Army and the 10th Aegean Division. For the operation General Todorov could rely on 58 battalions, 116 machine guns, 57 artillery batteries and five cavalry squadrons in his army and an additional 25 battalions, 24 machine guns, 31 batteries, and five squadrons in the 10th Division.

== Occupation and consequences ==
The Struma Offensive began on 18 August with the 7th Rila, 11th Macedonian Division and 3/2 Infantry Brigade and 10th Division advancing on a 230 km long front. For six days, the Bulgarian forces achieved all their objectives in the face of weak Greek and French resistance: following the ouster of pro-Entente Prime Minister Eleftherios Venizelos, the Greek royal government in Athens had demobilized its forces and pursued a course of neutrality at all costs, even ordering the local Greek troops not to resist the Bulgarian invasion.

The depth of the advance reached 80-90 km, and an area of 4,000 km^{2} was occupied. Most importantly, however, the Macedonian Front was shortened by 100 - 120 kilometres. In addition, the demobilized Greek IV Army Corps, under Col. Ioannis Hatzopoulos, numbering 464 officers and 6373 soldiers, that was positioned in the area but wasn't allowed by the Greek government to resist, was disbanded, and its troops and armament were interned by the Germans in Görlitz for the rest of the war. General Nikolaos Christodoulou did not obey the government and, together with his men, joined the Movement of National Defence that broke out in Thessaloniki.
The cities of Kavala, Drama and Serres were taken by the Bulgarians.

== Aftermath ==
The refusal by the Greek government to defend this territory won after hard fighting in the Second Balkan War of 1913, led to a coup by pro-Venizelist officers and the formation of the so-called "Provisional Government of National Defence." Greece joined the war in 1917 and eventually recovered all the occupied territories in 1918, at the war's end.

The Bulgarian occupation of eastern Macedonia was subsequently investigated by an Inter-Allied commission, which published its report in 1919.
