= IV Army Corps (Greece) =

Supreme Military Command of Thrace
- Ανώτατη Στρατιωτική Διοίκηση Θράκης
- Camp flag of the Supreme Military Command of Thrace
- Active: 1913–1941; 1976–present
- Country: Greece
- Branch: Hellenic Army
- Type: Armoured; Mechanized infantry
- Size: Corps
- Part of: First Army
- Garrison/HQ: Xanthi
- Mottos: Solve the knot with the sword Τῷ ξίφει τὸν δεσμόν λελύσθαι To ksifi ton desmon lelisthe
- Engagements: World War I: Macedonian front; Internment at Görlitz; Greco-Turkish War (1919-1922); World War II: Greco-Italian War; Battle of Greece

Commanders
- Notable commanders: Ioannis Hatzopoulos; Konstantinos Korkas

The Supreme Military Command of Thrace (Greek: Ανώτατη Στρατιωτική Διοίκηση Θράκης, abbr. ΑΣΔΙΘ) is an army corps of the Hellenic Army. Established before the First World War, it served in all conflicts Greece participated in until the German invasion of Greece in 1941. Re-established in 1976, it has been guarding the Greco-Turkish land border along the Evros River, and is the most powerful formation in the Hellenic Army. The IV Army Corps was changed to the Higher Military Command of Thrace due to the phase B of the Agenda 2030 Plan.

== History ==
The IV Army Corps was established by Royal Decree on 23 December 1913 (O.S.) at Kavala, Eastern Macedonia, during the reorganization of the Hellenic Army following the Balkan Wars. When Eastern Macedonia was occupied by Bulgarian and German forces during World War I, the entire Corps, under its commander Col. Ioannis Hatzopoulos, demobilized and forbidden to offer resistance by the government in Athens, was carried by rail to Görlitz, Germany, as "guests" of the German Government, where they remained for almost three years.

During the Greco-Turkish War it was renamed the Army of Thrace and was stationed in Adrianople. In 1922, after the defeat of the Hellenic forces in Asia Minor, it covered the withdrawal of many units to Thrace, and formed part of the Army of Evros.

In November 1940, during the Greco-Italian War, it was renamed again as Eastern Macedonia Army Section (ΤΣΑΜ) joining the rest of the army which was fighting in Albania. In April 1941 it surrendered to German forces.

In 1976 the Corps was reformed in Xanthi and currently is the most powerful formation of the Hellenic Army. In 1994 it remained headquartered at Xanthi.

== Structure ==
IV Army Corps locations

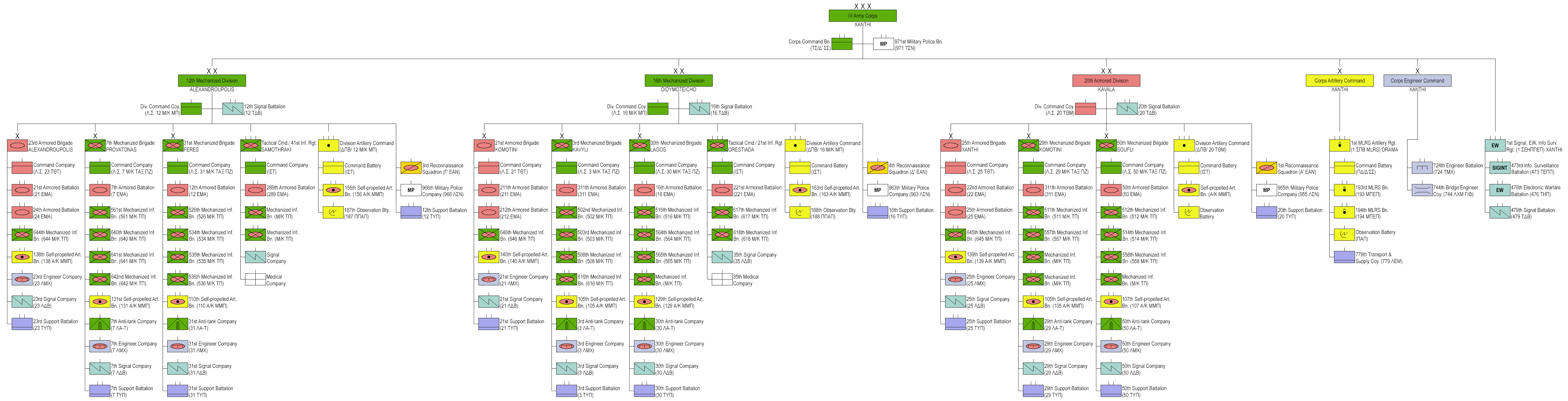
IV Corps Structure until 2014

- Supreme Military Command of Thrace (ΑΣΔΙΘ), in Xanthi, (Thrace)
  - 12th Mechanized Division (XII Μ/Κ ΜΠ), in Alexandroupolis, (Thrace)
    - Division HQ Company (ΛΣ/ΧΙΙ Μ/Κ ΜΠ)
    - 7th Mechanized Brigade "Sarantaporos" (7η M/K ΤΑΞ Σαραντάπορος), in Lykofytos, (Thrace)
    - 23rd Armored Brigade "3rd Cavalry Regiment - Dorylaeum" (XXIII ΤΘΤ 3ο Σύνταγμα Ιππικού Δορύλαιον), in Alexandroupolis, (Thrace)
    - 31st Mechanized Brigade "Kamia" (31η M/K ΤΑΞ Κάμια), in Feres, (Thrace)
    - Tactical Command/41st Infantry Regiment (ΤΔ/41ο ΣΠ), in Samothrace, (North Aegean)
    - 3rd Armored Cavalry Squadron (Γ' ΕΑΝ)
    - Division Artillery Command and units (ΔΠΒ/ΧΙΙ Μ/Κ ΜΠ)
    - 12th Signal Battalion (12ο ΤΔΒ)
  - 16th Mechanized Division (XVI Μ/Κ ΜΠ), in Didymoteicho, (Thrace)
    - Division HQ Company (ΛΣ/XVI Μ/Κ ΜΠ)
    - 3rd Mechanized Brigade "Rimini" (3η M/K ΤΑΞ Ρίμινι), in Kavyli, (Thrace)
    - 21st Armored Brigade "Cavalry Brigade Pindus" (XXI ΤΘΤ Ταξιαρχία Ιππικού Πίνδος), in Komotini, (Thrace)
    - 30th Mechanized Brigade "Tomoritsa" (30ή M/K ΤΑΞ Τομορίτσα), in Lagos, (Thrace)
    - Tactical Command/21st Infantry Regiment "Drama" (ΤΔ/21ο ΣΠ Δράμα), in Orestiada, (Thrace)
    - 4th Armored Cavalry Squadron (Δ' ΕΑΝ)
    - Division Artillery Command and units (ΔΠΒ/XVI Μ/Κ ΜΠ)
    - 16th Signal battalion (16ο ΤΔΒ)
  - 20th Armored Division (XX ΤΘΜ), in Kavala, (Eastern Macedonia)
    - Division HQ Company (ΙΣ/ΧΧ ΤΘΜ)
    - 25th Armored Brigade "2nd Cavalry Regiment - Ephesus" (XXV ΤΘΤ 2ο Σύνταγμα Ιππικού Έφεσος), in Xanthi, (Thrace)
    - 29th Mechanized Brigade "Pogradets" (29η ΤΑΞΠΖ Πόγραδετς), in Komotini, (Thrace)
    - 50th Mechanized Brigade "Apsos" (50ή M/K ΤΑΞ Άψος), in Soufli, (Thrace)
    - Division Artillery Command and units (ΔΠΒ/ΧΧ ΤΘΜ)
    - 20th Signal Battalion (20ό ΤΔΒ)
  - 1st Artillery Regiment-MLRS (1o ΣΠΒ), in Drama, (Eastern Macedonia)
    - HQ Company (ΛΔ/1ο ΣΠΒ)
    - 193rd Multiple Rocket Launcher Battalion (193 ΜΠΕΠ)
    - 194th Multiple Rocket Launcher Battalion (194 ΜΠΕΠ)
    - Observation Battery (ΠΠΑΠ)
  - 1st Communications, EW, Surveillance Regiment (1ο ΣΕΗΠΠΕΠ), in Xanthi, (Thrace)
  - Corps Field and Air Defense Artillery Command and units (ΔΠΒ/Δ' ΣΣ)
  - Corps Engineer Command and units (ΔΜΧ/Δ' ΣΣ)
  - Corps HQ Battalion
