= Ioannis Hatzopoulos =

Greek Army officer

Colonel Ioannis Hatzopoulos
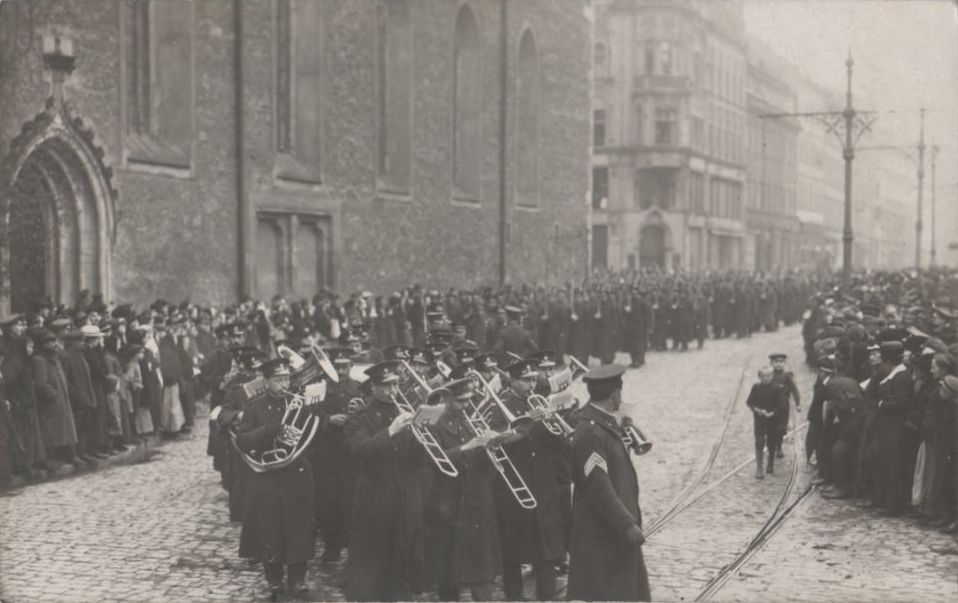
- The funeral of Ioannis Hatzopoulos c. 1918
- Born: c. 1862 Patras, Kingdom of Greece
- Died: 15 April 1918 Görlitz, Kingdom of Saxony, German Empire
- Allegiance: Kingdom of Greece
- Branch: Hellenic Army
- Rank: Colonel
- Commands: IV Army Corps
- Battles / wars: Greco-Turkish War (1897); Balkan Wars; First Balkan War; Second Balkan War; World War I; Macedonian front (POW)

Ioannis Hatzopoulos (Greek: Ιωάννης Χατζόπουλος, c. 1862–1918) was a Hellenic Army officer, who commanded the IV Army Corps in 1916 and was interned with his men in Görlitz, Germany.

Hatzopoulos was born in Patras in about 1862. A career artillery officer, he fought in the Greco-Turkish War of 1897 and the Balkan Wars of 1912–13.

In 1916, he was commander of the IV Army Corps in eastern Macedonia, with his headquarters at Kavala. The corps had been demobilized by the royal Greek government in Athens and numbered a fraction of its full strength. When the Bulgarian Army, with some German units, invaded eastern Macedonia in August 1916, Hatzopoulos was forbidden by the Greek government to offer any resistance. As a result, he and the bulk of his men—464 officers and 6373 soldiers—surrendered to the Germans and were interned for the rest of the war at Görlitz. These events provoked immediate reaction among the Greek officer corps, with the outbreak of a French-backed military revolt in Thessaloniki and the establishment of the Provisional Government of National Defence there, eventually leading to Greece's formal entry into World War I on the side of the Entente.

Hatzopoulos never saw Greece again, as he died at Görlitz on 15 April 1918.
