= Internment of the Greek IV Corps at Görlitz =

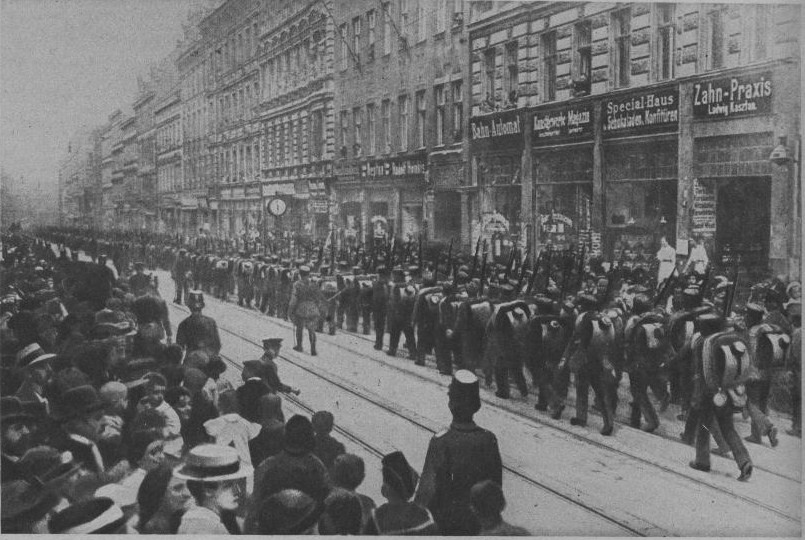
Men of IV Corps march through the streets of Görlitz

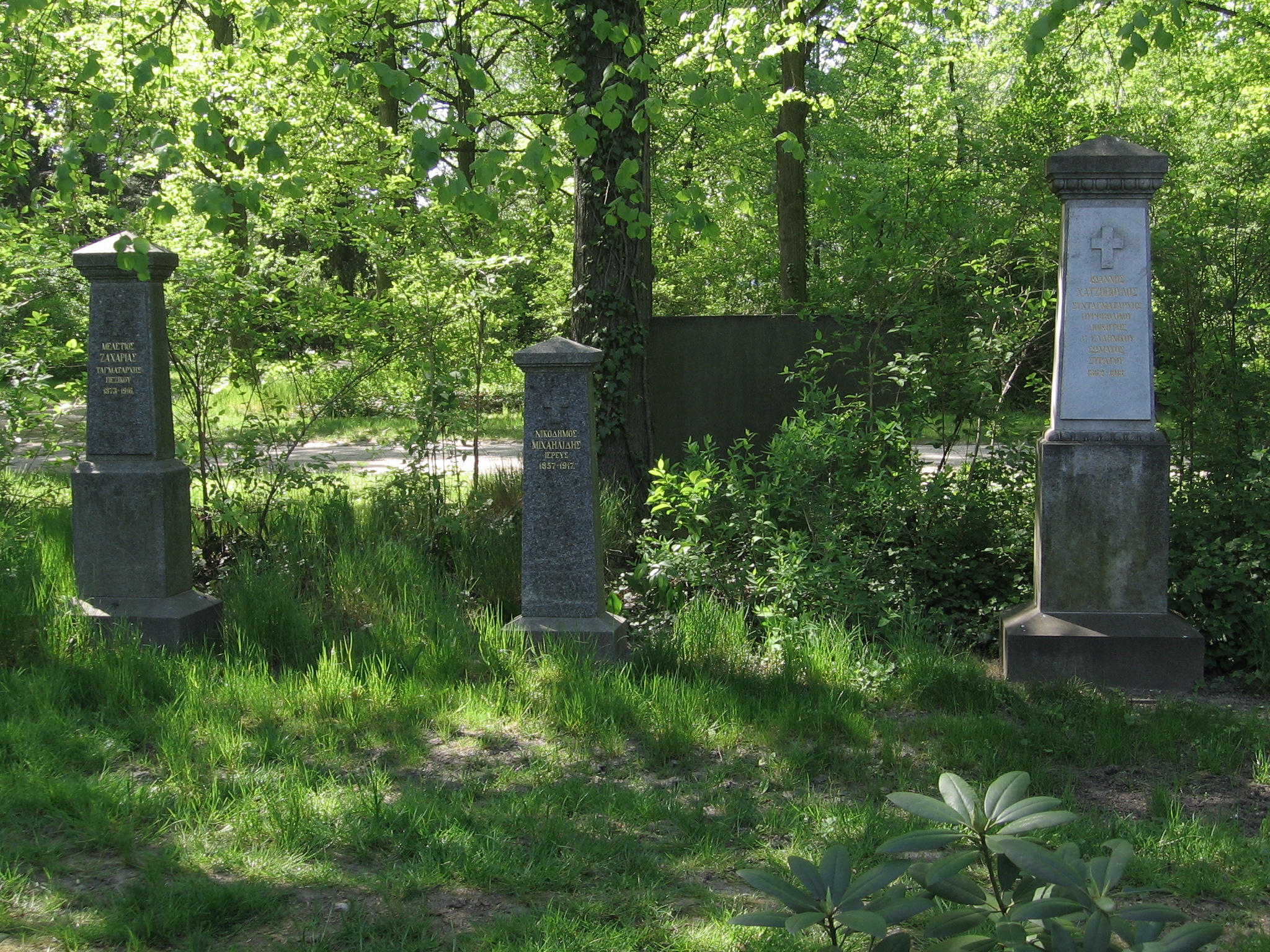
Graves of Greek soldiers in Görlitz

Between 1916 and 1919, 464 officers and 6373 soldiers of the Greek Army's IV Army Corps were interned in the German city of Görlitz, officially as "guests" of the German Empire, for the duration of World War I. During August 1916, Bulgarian and German forces invaded the Greek territory of eastern Macedonia, ostensibly in order to confront the Allied troops who had established themselves in and around the northern Greek city of Thessaloniki. The Greek government had given its local forces strict orders to oppose neither the Allies nor the Central Powers, in an attempt to preserve the country's neutrality during the conflict. However, contrary to German assurances that they would respect Greek sovereignty and civil authorities, the Bulgarians quickly made clear that they aimed to annex the territories they captured, and tried to isolate and capture the Greek troops of IV Corps piecemeal. To avoid Bulgarian captivity, the acting commander of the corps, Colonel Ioannis Hatzopoulos, asked the German authorities to accept moving his men to Germany for the duration of the war.

Between 15–27 September 1916, Hatzopoulos and his men were moved by train to Görlitz, where they were interned for the remainder of the war. The presence of the Greeks in the German town provoked mixed reactions. Initially welcomed, the Greeks were allowed to leave their barracks and move about town and drew a regular salary from the German government. Mixed Greek–German unions occurred, and many Greeks found employment in the town. However, as the war progressed, the German populace and authorities became more hostile. Most of the internees returned to Greece in 1919, where for years they were stigmatized as traitors by the Venizelists.

== Sources ==
- Alexatos, Gerasimos (2010). "«Χαίρετε»: Ένα ελληνικό σώμα στρατού στο Γκαίρλιτς" ["Χαίρετε": A Greek army corps in Görlitz]. In Chrysos, Evangelos K.; Schultheiß, Wolfgang (eds.). Ορόσημα ελληνο-γερμανικών σχέσεων. Πρακτικά ελληνο-γερμανικού συνεδρίου, Αθήνα, 16 και 17 Απριλίου 2010 [Milestones of Greek–German relations. Proceedings of the Greek–German conference, Athens, 16 and 17 April 2010] (in Greek). Hellenic Parliament Foundation. ISBN 978-960-6757-28-0.
- Alexatos, Gerasimos; Dordanas, Stratos, eds. (2014). "Εν Γκαίρλιτς 31/12/1917..." Ημερολόγιο αιχμαλωσίας του βενιζελικού αξιωματικού Στυλιανού Κανδυλάκη στη Γερμανία του Κάιζερ ["In Görlitz, 31.12.1917..." Captivity diary in the Kaiser's Germany of the Venizelist officer Stylianos Kandylakis] (in Greek). Kyriakidis Editions. ISBN 978-618-5105-02-0.
- Alexatos, Gerasimos (2015). Οι Έλληνες του Γκαίρλιτς 1916-1919 [The Greeks of Görlitz 1916-1919] (in Greek). Kyriakidis Editions. ISBN 978-960-599-022-0.
- Schlötzer, Christiane (1 January 2017). "Als die Griechen nach Görlitz kamen" (in German). Süddeutsche Zeitung.
- Seewald, Berthold (5 October 2016). "Als man in Görlitz freundlich zu Fremden war" (in German). Die Welt.
