= XVI Corps =

16 Corps, 16th Corps, Sixteenth Corps, or XVI Corps may refer to:

== Germany ==
=== German Empire ===
- XVI Corps (German Empire), Imperial German Army, prior to and during World War I

=== Nazi Germany ===
- XVI Army Corps (Wehrmacht)
- XVI SS Corps, Waffen-SS

== Russia and Soviet Union ==
=== Russian Empire ===
- 16th Army Corps (Russian Empire)

=== Soviet Union ===
- 16th Rifle Corps
- 16th Tank Corps

== United Kingdom ==
- XVI Corps (United Kingdom), a unit in World War I

=== Artillery Volunteer Corps ===
- 16th Lanarkshire Artillery Volunteer Corps

=== Rifle Volunteer Corps ===
- 16th (Stonehouse) Devonshire Rifle Volunteer Corps
- 16th (Castle Eden) Durham Rifle Volunteer Corps
- 16th (North Cotswold Rifles) Gloucestershire Rifle Volunteer Corps
- 16th (3rd Manchester) Lancashire Rifle Volunteer Corps
- 16th Middlesex (London Irish) Rifle Volunteers
- 16th Staffordshire Rifle Volunteer Corps
- 16th (Battle) Sussex Rifle Volunteer Corps

== United States ==
- XVI Corps (Union Army), American Civil War
- XVI Corps (United States)

== Other countries ==
- 16th Army Corps (France)
- XVI Corps (India)
- XVI Army Corps (Italy)
- XVI Corps (Ottoman Empire)
- XVI Army Corps (Spain)
- 16th Army Corps (Ukraine)

== See also ==
- List of military corps by number
- 16th Army (disambiguation)
- 16th Division (disambiguation)
- 16th Group (disambiguation)
- 16th Wing (disambiguation)
- 16th Brigade (disambiguation)
- 16th Regiment (disambiguation)
- 16th Battalion (disambiguation)
- 16th Squadron (disambiguation)
- 16th (disambiguation)
