= 16th Cavalry =

16th Cavalry may refer to:

== Divisions ==
- 16th Cavalry Division (Russian Empire)
- 16th Cavalry Division (Soviet Union)

== Regiments ==
- 16th Airborne Divisional Signal Regiment (Middlesex Yeomanry)
- 16th Canadian Light Horse
- 16th Cavalry Regiment (British Indian Army)
- 16th Cavalry Regiment (United States)
- 16th Corps Cavalry Regiment, British Army
- 16th Light Cavalry, Indian Army
- 16th The Queen's Lancers

=== American Civil War regiments ===
==== Union Army ====
- 16th Illinois Cavalry Regiment
- 16th Kansas Cavalry Regiment
- 16th Kentucky Cavalry Regiment
- 16th New York Cavalry Regiment
- 16th Pennsylvania Cavalry Regiment

==== Confederate Army ====
- 16th Arkansas Infantry Regiment
- 16th Texas Cavalry Regiment
- 16th Virginia Cavalry Regiment

== Battalions and companies ==
- 16th (Royal 1st Devon and Royal North Devon Yeomanry) Battalion, Devonshire Regiment
- 16th (Sussex Yeomanry) Battalion, Royal Sussex Regiment
- 16th (Worcestershire) Company, Imperial Yeomanry

== See also ==
- 16th Division (disambiguation)
- 16th Brigade (disambiguation)
- 16th Regiment (disambiguation)
- 16th (disambiguation)
