= Sixteenth =

Sixteenth or 16th may refer to:

- The ordinal form of the number 16
- A fraction, 1/16, equal to one of 16 equal parts
- Sixteenth of the month, a recurring calendar date
- Sixteenth note, a note played for half the duration of an eighth note
- 16th birthday, the age of majority in several countries
  - Sweet Sixteenth birthday celebration event

== Geography ==
- 16th meridian east, a line of longitude
- 16th meridian west, a line of longitude
- 16th parallel north, a circle of latitude
- 16th parallel south, a circle of latitude
- 16th Avenue (disambiguation)
- 16th Street (disambiguation)

== Military ==
- 16th Army (disambiguation)
- 16th Battalion (disambiguation)
- 16th Brigade (disambiguation)
- 16th Division (disambiguation)
- 16th Regiment (disambiguation)
- 16th Squadron (disambiguation)

== Others ==
- Sixteenth Amendment (disambiguation)
  - Sixteenth Amendment to the United States Constitution
- 16th century
- 16th century BC

== See also ==
- 16 (disambiguation)
