= 16th Mechanised Division =

16th Mechanised Division may refer to:

- 16th Mechanized Infantry Division (Greece)
- 16th Mechanised Division (Poland)
- 16th Guards Mechanised Division, Soviet Union

== See also ==
- 16th Division (disambiguation)
