= 1st Independent Division of Anhui Provincial Military District (2nd Formation) =

Independent Division of Zhejiang Provincial Military District (1964–66) 1st Independent Division of Zhejiang Provincial Military District (1966–75) 1st Independent Division of Anhui Provincial Military District (1975-76) Independent Division of Anhui Provincial Military District (1976-80)
- Active: December 1964 – December 1980
- Country: People's Republic of China
- Branch: People's Liberation Army
- Type: Division
- Role: Infantry

Independent Division of Zhejiang Provincial Military District (Chinese: 浙江省军区独立师)(1st Formation) was formed in December 1964 from the assets of 82nd Garrison Regiment of the inactivating 16th Garrison Division and 92nd Garrison Regiment.

The division was composed of three infantry regiments (1st to 3rd) and a machine-gun artillery battalion.

In July 1966, the division was renamed 1st Independent Division of Zhejiang Provincial Military District (Chinese: 浙江省军区独立第1师) following the formation of the 2nd Independent Division of Zhejiang Provincial Military District.

From August 1967 to November 14, 1969, the division was put under command of 20th Army Corps. After that the division was returned to Zhejiang Provincial Military District's control.

On March 25, 1975, the division exchanged its designation and position with 1st Independent Division of Zhejiang Provincial Military District (2nd Formation) and became the second formation of 1st Independent Division of Anhui Provincial Military District(Chinese: 安徽省军区独立第1师). The exchange was ordered by Communist Party Vice Chairman Deng Xiaoping because military personnel in the divisions had taken active roles in local politics.

On May 26, 1976, the division was renamed as Independent Division of Anhui Provincial Military District(Chinese: 安徽省军区独立师) following 2nd Independent Division of Anhui Provincial Military District's disbandment. The artillery Regiment of the disbanding 73rd Army Division was attached to the division.

In December 1980 the division was disbanded.
