= 3rd Mechanised Brigade =

3rd Mechanised Brigade or similar may refer to:

- 3rd Mechanised Brigade (France)
- 3rd Mechanized Brigade "Goito"
- 3rd Mechanized Infantry Brigade, Greece
- 3rd Heavy Mechanized Brigade, Ukraine

== See also ==
- 3rd Brigade (disambiguation)
- 3rd Armoured Brigade (disambiguation)
- 3rd Infantry Brigade (disambiguation)
- 3rd Motor Brigade (disambiguation)
