= 16th Division =

16th Division or 16th Infantry Division may refer to:

== Infantry divisions ==
- 16th Infantry Division (Belgium)
- 16th Motor Rifle Division (Bulgaria)
- 16th Garrison Division, People's Republic of China
- 16th Infantry Division (France)
- 16th Division (German Empire), a unit of the Prussian/German Army
- 16th Landwehr Division, German Empire
- 16th Reserve Division, a unit of the Imperial German Army in World War I
- 16th Infantry Division (Wehrmacht), of the German Army was created in 1934 as Kommandant von Münster
- 16th SS Panzergrenadier Division Reichsführer-SS, Germany
- 16th Volksgrenadier Division, Germany
- 16th Mechanized Infantry Division (Greece), a major mechanized infantry formation of the Hellenic Army
- 16th Indian Division, British Indian Army during World War I
- 16th Infantry Division "Pistoia", Italy
- 16th Division (Imperial Japanese Army), an infantry division in the Imperial Japanese Army
- 16th Infantry Division (Ottoman Empire)
- 16th Mechanised Division (Poland), a military unit of the Polish Army
- 16th Infantry Division (Russian Empire)
- 16th Guards Airborne Division, Soviet Union
- 16th Guards Mechanised Division, Soviet Union
- 16th Guards Motor Rifle Division, Soviet Union
- 16th Guards Rifle Division, Soviet Union
- 16th Rifle Division (Soviet Union), a formation in the Red Army created during the Second World War
- 16th Division (Spain), a unit of the Spanish Republican Army during the Spanish Civil War
- 16th Division (Syrian rebel group)
- 16th Airborne Division, United Kingdom
- 16th (Irish) Division, a voluntary 'Service' division of Kitchener's New Army raised in Ireland from the 'National Volunteers', initially in September 1914, after the outbreak of the Great War
- 16th Division, National Guard division established in early 1917 consisting of Ohio and West Virginia; later 37th Infantry Division
- 16th Division (United States), short-lived World War I division, established in 1918 and disbanded in March 1919
- 16th Division (Yugoslav Partisans)

== Armoured/cavalry divisions ==
- 16th Panzer Division, Wehrmacht, Germany
- 16th Armoured Division (Iran)
- 16th Cavalry Division (Russian Empire)
- 16th Guards Tank Division, Soviet Union
- 16th Tank Division (Soviet Union)
- 16th Armored Division (United States), an armored division of the United States Army in World War II

== Other divisions ==
- 16th Artillery Division, People's Republic of China
- 16th Anti-Aircraft Artillery Division (Soviet Union)
- 16th Guards Fighter Aviation Division, Soviet Union

== See also ==
- 16th Army (disambiguation)
- XVI Corps (disambiguation)
- 16th Wing (disambiguation)
- 16th Group (disambiguation)
- 16th Regiment (disambiguation)
- 16th Brigade (disambiguation)
- 16th Squadron (disambiguation)
