= 16th Street station =

16th Street station may refer to:

- 16th Street station (BMT Fifth Avenue Line), a former elevated station in New York City
- 16th Street station (Oakland), a former intercity rail station
- 16th Street station (Sacramento), a Sacramento RT Light Rail station
- 16th Street Mission station, a BART station in San Francisco

== See also ==
- 16th Street (disambiguation)
