= 16th Infantry =

16th Infantry may refer to:

- 16th Infantry Division (disambiguation)
- 16th Infantry Brigade (disambiguation)
- 16th Infantry Regiment (disambiguation)

== See also ==
- 16th (disambiguation)
