= Ellinochori =

Ellinochori (Greek: Ελληνοχώρι) may refer to the following places in Greece:

- Ellinochori, Evros, a village in the Evros regional unit
- Ellinochori, Corinthia, a place in Corinthia
