= 16th Army =

16th Army may refer to:

- 16th Army (People's Republic of China), the 16th Group Army
- 16th Army (Wehrmacht), German Army, World War II
- Sixteenth Army (Japan), Imperial Japanese Army
- Sixteenth Area Army, Imperial Japanese Army
- 16th Army (RSFSR), Red Army, Russian Civil War
- 16th Army (Soviet Union), Soviet Army, World War II
- 16th Air Army, Soviet Union/Russia

== See also ==
- List of armies by number
- XVI Corps (disambiguation)
- 16th Division (disambiguation)
- 16th Brigade (disambiguation)
- 16th Regiment (disambiguation)
- 16th Battalion (disambiguation)
- 16th Wing (disambiguation)
- 16th Squadron (disambiguation)
- 16th Group (disambiguation)
- 16th (disambiguation)
