= NS16 =

NS16, NS 16, NS-16, NS.16, or variation, may refer to:

== Places ==
- Ang Mo Kio MRT station (station code NS16), Ang Mo Kio, Singapore; a mass transit station
- Dartmouth East (constituency N.S. 16), Nova Scotia, Canada; a provincial electoral district
- Paramaribo District (FIPS region code NS16), Suriname

== Other uses ==
- Blue Origin NS-16, a suborbital space tourism flight on 2021 July 20 from Blue Origin
- RAF N.S. 16, a British NS class airship

== See also ==
- NS (disambiguation)
- 16 (disambiguation)
