= Fyodor Ogorodnikov =

Fyodor Evlampievich Ogorodnikov
- Born: June 16, 1867 Saint Petersburg, Russian Empire
- Died: March 3, 1939 (aged 71) Moscow, Soviet Union
- Allegiance: Russian Empire; Soviet Union
- Branch: Imperial Russian Army; Soviet Red Army
- Rank: lieutenant general (Russian Empire); Komdiv (Soviet Union)
- Commands: 26th Infantry Division (Russian Empire); Southwestern Front
- Conflicts: World War I Russian Civil War

Fyodor Evlampievich Ogorodnikov (June 16, 1867 – March 3, 1939) was a Russian and Soviet military activist and historian. Lieutenant General (1916). Komdiv (1935).

== Biography ==
The son of the ethnography and Statistics E. C. Ogorodnikov. He graduated from the Alexander Cadet Corps and the Nikolayev Engineering School (1887). From the school, Lieutenant was released to the Grenadier Bomb Battalion. He was later transferred to the LEJB Guard bomb; the battalion with the same office and seniority. Lieutenant (Precedence of August 7, 1891). In 1893, he graduated from the General Staff Academy at first level. Senior adjutant at the headquarters of the 1st Grenadier Division (26 November 1893 – 1 February 1898). Cenzovoe command served in the 2nd Grenadjorskom Rostov Regiment (2 October 1895 – 9 October 1896). Stolonachal'nik of the General Directorate of Cossack Troops (February 1, 1898 – July 7, 1899). Lieutenant Colonel (seniority December 6, 1898). Assistant to the Office of the Military Scientist Committee of the main Headquarters (July 7, 1899 – April 17, 1901), Senior clerk (April 17, 1901 – May 1, 1903). Professor of statistics and geography of the Staff Academy, since 1902. In 1904–1907, he was a military attaché at the Russian consulate in Tianjin. He then commanded the 15th Schlüsselburg Infantry Regiment. Major General (1911).

=== First World War ===
At the beginning of the First World War, the chief of staff of the 22nd Army Corps. Since November 14, 1914, he has been a general for instructions to the commander of the 10th Army. He commanded the 26th Infantry Division from August 25, 1915. From August 11, 1916, he was chief of the 125 Infantry Division. Lieutenant General (1916). After the February Revolution on April 2, 1917, he was commander of the 17th Army Corps. The 11th Army of General Erdeli participated in the June offensive. Was unsuccessful and was transferred to the reserve of officers at the headquarters of the Kiev Military District on July 28, 1917. Following the statement by General Kornilov and the displacement of a number of senior military commanders, Ogorodnikov was appointed commander of the Southwest Front armies on 29 August 1917. He supervised the purification of the army from Prokornilovski-tuned officers and released the soldiers arrested earlier for the revolutionary propaganda. In the few days that Ogorodnikov stood at the head of the front, the troops almost completely withdrew from obedience. On 9 September 9, 1917, he was replaced by General N. G. Volodchenko.

=== Red Army ===
In the Red Army, since February 1918, he was the cinema house Belomorsky of the District Military commissariat in 1919, the Western Front's assistant chief of supply. From 1920, at the Brass Military Academy of Army, he served at army headquarters. In 1931, he was arrested by T. H. "The His case" (his son, F. Ogorodnikov) was repressed in this case. Since 1932-Head of department at the Military Transport Academy and Professor of Military Academy. M. Frunze. Author of History and tactics. He died in Moscow. He was buried in Novodevichy Cemetery.

== Essay ==
- The German Field Service Statute, published in 1900, compared with the same statute of 1894 years. -UPB: Type. The General Directorate of the Lot, 1900.
- The German railways are militarily. -St. Petersburg: Print shop for the general department of the Lot, 1901.
- Military assets of England for Revolutionary and Napoleonic Wars. -UPB: Type. B. F. Kirshbauma, 1902.
- The tactical views of the Germans on the composition of the beam. -St. Petersburg: Print Shop for the General Directorate of the Lot, 1903.
- A reminder of the private in the crumbled building. Warsaw: Printing Office of the district headquarters, 1910.
- Practical instructions for the preparation of a single link arrow and an infantry training regulation 1911-UPB: In Berezovsky, 1912.
- Essays on comparative Tactics. Gra. 1-3. -M.-L., 1928-1929
- Kolchak in the spring of 1919. -M., 1938.

== Awards ==
- Order of St. Stanislaus 3rd degree (1895)
- Order of St. Anna 3rd degree (1901)
- Order of St. Stanislaus 2nd degree (1905);
- Order of St. Anna 2nd degree (1910; 18.03.1911);
- Order of St. Vladimir 3rd degree (06.12.1913);
- Swords to the Order of St. Anna 1st degree (MP 18.03.1916).

Military offices
Preceded by	Commander of the 26th Infantry Division; 1915–1916	Succeeded by
Preceded by Anton Denikin	Commander of the Southwestern Front; August 29 – September 9, 1917	Succeeded by Nikolai Volodchenko

== Bibliography ==
- Zaleski C. A. Who was in the First World War. -M.: AST; Astrel, 2003. -896 C.-5000 copies. -ISBN 5-17-019670-9 (act); ISBN 5-271-06895-1 (astrel).
