= 35th Infantry Division (Russian Empire) =

- 35-я пехотная дивизия
- Active: 1914–1918
- Country: Russian Empire
- Branch: Russian Imperial Army
- Role: Infantry

The 35th Infantry Division (Russian: 35-я пехо́тная диви́зия, 35-ya Pekhotnaya Diviziya) was an infantry formation of the Russian Imperial Army.

== Organization ==
It was part of the 17th Army Corps.

- 1st Brigade
  - 137th Infantry Regiment
  - 138th Infantry Regiment
- 2nd Brigade
  - 139th Infantry Regiment
  - 140th Infantry Regiment
- 35th Artillery Brigade
