= Nikolai Nikolayevich Malakhov =

Russian general (1827–1908)

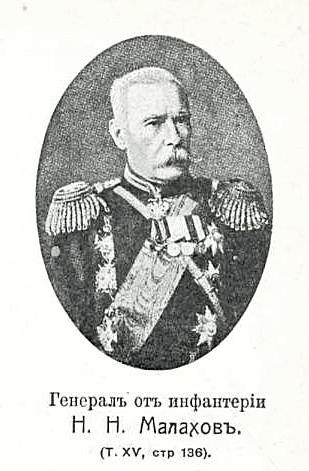
- Born: 1827; Arkhangelsk, Russian Empire
- Died: 4 April 1908 (aged 80–81); St. Petersburg, Russian Empire
- Military career
- Allegiance: Russian Empire
- Branch: Imperial Russian Army
- Rank: General of the Infantry
- Commands: 1st Brigade, 26th Infantry Division (Russian Empire); 26th Infantry Division (Russian Empire)

Nikolai Nikolayevich Malakhov (1827 – 4 April 1908) was a Russian military leader and infantry general (1895).

== Biography ==
Malakhov was born on 6 (18) May 1827 (in the Petersburg's necrology - 1826) in Arkhangelsk, in the family of the customs manager. His mother was E.S. Tagaychikova, daughter of the provincial secretary of the Galich district of the Kostroma province. He was baptized on 14 May 1827 in the Orthodox Archangel Cathedral.

=== Chronological track record ===
1846 - Graduated from the School of Guards Ensigns and Cavalry Junkers in the 1st category and graduated from non-commissioned officers as an ensign in the Jaeger Life Guards Regiment.

6 December 1848 - Second Lieutenant, assigned to the School of Guards Ensigns and Cavalry Junkers for testing as a company officer. Upon graduation, he was promoted to a company officer of this school.

1849 - Took part in the 1849 campaign in Hungary and Transylvania.

12 June 1852 - Lieutenant.

24 August 1854 - Staff captain.

1858 - Chief of Police of the School of Guards Ensigns and Cavalry Junkers.

17 April 1858 - Awarded the Order of St. Stanislaus, 3rd degree.

3 April 1860 - Captain.

17 April 1860 - Awarded the Order of St. Anna, 3rd degree.

17 April 1862 - Awarded the Order of St. Stanislaus, 2nd degree.

17 April 1863 - Colonel, appointed company commander at the Nikolaev School of Guards Junkers (former school). He served as a company commander for 2 years and 7 months.

1864 - Received the Imperial crown to the Order of St. Stanislaus, 2nd degree

4 November 1864 - 30 May 1871 - Second in command of the Vilna military district, appointed head of the then-formed Vilnius infantry cadet school.

30 July 1866 - awarded the Order of St. Anne, 2nd degree.

    1866 - at a time - 732 rubles.
    1868 - at a time - 732 rubles.
    4 January 1870 - awarded the Order of St. Vladimir, 4th degree.

28 March 1871 - Major General (for distinction).

Almost seven years of fruitful activity by General Malakhov for the benefit of the school was appreciated by the Sovereign Emperor, both with personal gratitude during the examinations and during the presentation to His Majesty, as well as many awards, of which the latter was for honors in his service as a major general.

   - Antonov A.N.[4]

1871-1873 - assigned to the 26th Infantry Division.

   3 August 1873 - 12 September 1874 - Assistant Chief of the 14th Infantry Division (Russian Empire) - Commander of the 1st Brigade of the Division.
   12 September - 1 October 1874 - Commander of the 1st Brigade of the 27th Infantry Division (Russian Empire).

1 October 1874- 14 March 1879 - commander of the 1st brigade of the 26th Infantry Division (Russian Empire), with which he took part in the Russian-Turkish war of 1877–1878.

[During the war of 1877–1878,] "commanding a separate detachment, on 2 September NN Malakhov with a sudden and energetic attack took on a fortified Turkish position near the village of Osikovo (in the area of the Ruschuk detachment); On 9 September he distinguished himself in the battle at Tserkovna (Chairkioi), and on 22 November he shot down the Turks from a strongly fortified position at Zlataritsa (the Order of St. Stanislaus 1st class with swords and St. Anna 1st class with swords and the Golden Weapon).

   - Military encyclopedia[5]

30 August 1875 - Awarded the Order of St. Vladimir, 3rd degree.

   27 February 1878 - Awarded the Order of St. Stanislav 1st class with swords.
   30 April 1878 - awarded with the Golden Sabre with the inscription "For Bravery" (St. George's weapon according to the status of 1913).
   4 December 1878 - Awarded the Order of St. Anne, 1st class with swords.

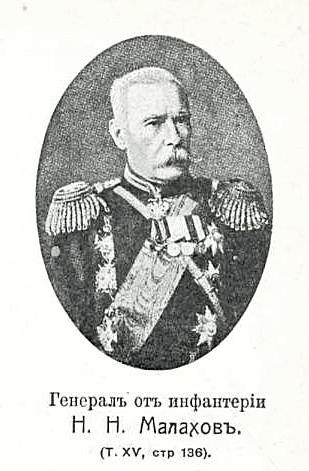

14 March 1879 - 20 January 1888 - Commander of the 26th Infantry Division (Russian Empire).

17 December 1880 - Nominal royal favour.

Art. 12 April 1881 - Lieutenant General (for distinction).

25 April 1881 - Nominal royal favour.

15 May 1883 - Awarded the Order of St. Vladimir, 2nd degree.

30 August 1886 - Awarded the Order of the White Eagle.

2 September 1886 - Personal royal favour.

20 January 1888 - November 1889 - Chief of the 1st Guards Infantry Division.

19 October 1888 - Awarded the Prussian Order of the Crown, 1st degree.

1888 - Leased 1,500 rubles per year for 6 years.

8 August 1889 - The highest gratitude and personalized highest gratitude.

11 August 1889 - 6 March 1903 - Commander of the Grenadier Corps.

19 May 1891 - The highest gratitude and personalized highest gratitude.

22 August 1891 - Awarded the XL Years Badge of Immaculate Service.

23 May 1892 - Awarded the Serbian Order of Takova 1st degree.

1 February 1893 - Awarded the Bukhara Order of the Rising Star (gold) 1st degree.

15 May 1893 - Royal gratitude.

1894 - The lease was increased to 2,500 rubles and continued for 4 years.

12 June 1895 - General of Infantry.

1896 - The highest gratitude.

30 August 1896 - Awarded the Order of St. Alexander Nevsky and diamond badges.

16 August 1898 - Royal gratitude.

15 February 1899 - Awarded the Romanian Order of the Grand Cross of the Star.

1 September 1899 - Awarded with the Bulgarian Order of St. Alexander, 1st degree.

17 April 1900 - Royal gratitude.

1 January 1901 - Awarded with the Order of St. Vladimir, 1st degree.

5 August 1902 - Awarded with the golden order of the Bukhara Star with diamonds.

1902 - Awarded with the "L years" badge of impeccable service.

1903 - The highest gratitude.

3 June 1903 - 16 February 1905 - Assistant Commander of the Moscow Military District (MVO).

16 February 1905 - 17 January 1906 - Commander of the Moscow Military District.

When he was appointed governor-general of Moscow in 1905, Dubasov turned to Minister Witte for help suppressing the unrest in Moscow. He, in turn, reported to the tsar: "In Moscow, there is complete anarchy of power. The early arrival of the new Governor-General is imperative. I do not know at all the commander of the troops there (N. N. Malakhov) - can we rely on his energy and foresight?" In his report to Witte, Nicholas II wrote: "Today I appointed General Panteleev as Adjutant General with instructions to go on a business trip instead of Dubasov. The latter should immediately come to Moscow, where he will meet with Panteleev ... Old man Malakhov is a worthy and firm general. "

   - About N. N. Malakhov in the book of V. N. Balyazin[7]

17 January 1906 - Appointed to serve in the Ministry of War in St. Petersburg.

He died in St. Petersburg on 4 (17) April 1908. He was buried at the Smolensk Orthodox cemetery. The grave has not survived.

== Family ==
His first wife was Elizaveta Karlovna, née Rudolph.

His sons - Alexander, Vladimir, and Konstantin - became military men. Moreover, the firstborn, Alexander, was baptized by Emperor Alexander II. The youngest son of Malakhov N.N. - Konstantin Nikolaevich (April 19, 1866 - March 1917) - in 1887, he graduated from the Vilna military school in the 2nd category and was released into the 101st Infantry Perm Regiment. In 1899 he was a lieutenant of the same regiment; at the end of his service, he became a colonel.

From Zinaida Vladislavovna Lopatsinskaya, even before marriage with her, he had a daughter, Elena, who was born on 08/04/1875, most likely in the Grodno province; "Condescending to the all-subject petition of the commander of the Grenadier Corps, Lieutenant-General Malakhov <...> it is allowed for his daughter Elena, who was nestled before marriage, to take the name of her father and enter into all the rights and advantages of legitimate children"; By the determination of the Heraldry Department of the Governing Senate on February 19, 1890, Elena Nikolaevna Malakhova was recognized as a hereditary nobility with the rank of Malakhovs ... ".

Elena Nikolayevna Malakhova (1875–1968) was married to Alexei Konstantinovich Smyslovsky (1874–1935),) a colonel who was captured during World War I. They had seven children: Boris (Holmston-Smyslovsky) (1897–1988); Tatiana (1899–1982); George (1900 - until 1913); Vera (1903–1967); Igor (1905–2000); Andrey (1909 - c. 1935); Cyril (1911–1995).

Military offices
Preceded by	Commander of the 1st Brigade, 26th Infantry Division; 1874-1879	Succeeded by
Preceded by	Commander of the 26th Infantry Division; 1879-1888	Succeeded by

== Sources ==
- Antonov A. N. XXXV. Vilna Infantry Cadet School. A brief historical sketch. - Vilna, 1900. - pp. 38–39. pp. cn. 1.
- Lists of generals by seniority in 1886 and 1903.
- Malakhov, Nikolai Nikolaevich // Military encyclopedia: [in 18 volumes] / ed. VF Novitsky ... [and others]. - SPb.; [M.]: Type. t-va I. D. Sytin, 1911–1915.
- Imperial House. Outstanding dignitaries: Encyclopedia of biographies: In 2 volumes / V. I. Fedorchenko. - Krasnoyarsk: Bonus, B. - (Russian Empire in faces). - ISBN 5-7867-0057-7
- Chiefs of VVU (VPUU). Colonel MALAKHOV Nikolay Nikolaevich.
