= 17th Army Corps (Russian Empire) =

- Country: Russian Empire
- Allegiance: Imperial Russian Army
- Engagements: World War I; Battle of the Vistula River; Battle of Galicia

The 17th Army Corps was an Army corps in the Imperial Russian Army.

== Composition ==
- 3rd Infantry Division
- 35th Infantry Division

== Part of ==
- 5th Army: 1914
- 4th Army: 1914
- 9th Army: 1914 - 1915
- 8th Army: 1915 - 1916
- 11th Army: 1916 - 1917
- 5th Army: 1917

== Commanders ==
- 08.11.1888 — 28.11.1892 — Lieutenant General Nikolai Zalesov
- 20.12.1892 — 14.07.1899 — Lieutenant General Stepan Stepanovič Leonov
- 14.07.1899 — 04.11.1905 — Lieutenant General Alexander Bilderling
- 12.02.1906 — 20.04.1906 — Lieutenant General Vladimir Volkov
- 24.04.1906 — 03.04.1909 — Lieutenant General Vladimir Glazov
- 15.04.1909 — 02.04.1917 — Lieutenant General Petr Yakovlev
- 02.04.1917 — 28.07.1917 — Lieutenant General Fyodor Ogorodnikov
- 28.07.1917 — хх.02.1918 — General-Major Nikolai Shilling
