= Nikolai Volodchenko =

Russian general (1862–1945)

Nikolai Gerasimovich Volodchenko
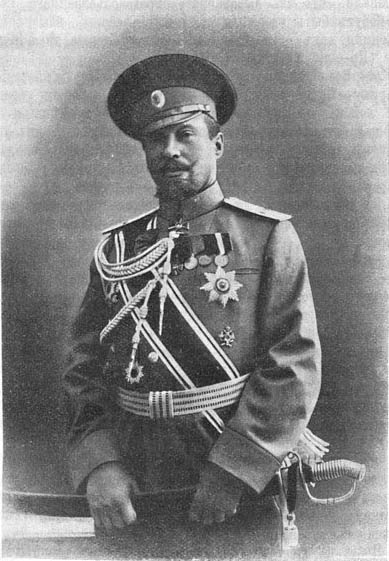
- Born: November 20, 1862; Hlukhiv, Russian Empire
- Died: 1945 (aged 82–83)
- Allegiance: Russian Empire
- Branch: (Russian Empire) Imperial Russian Army
- Service years: 1881–1917
- Rank: Lieutenant general
- Commands: Southwestern Front
- Conflicts: Russo-Japanese War; World War I Russian Civil War

Nikolai Gerasimovich Volodchenko (November 20, 1862 – 1945) was a Lieutenant-General of the Imperial Russian Army. In 1917, he was the commander-in-chief of the Southwestern front.

== Biography ==
=== Early life, education and career ===
Volodchenko was born in Hlukhiv on November 20, 1862, the son of a court councillor. He was educated at the 3rd St. Petersburg Military Gymnasium, at the end of which, on September 1, 1881, was enrolled in the Mikhailov Artillery School. He graduated on August 14, 1884, and became a lieutenant in the 1st Reserve Artillery Brigade, on August 7, 1886. In 1892, Volodchenko successfully passed the entrance examination to the Academy of General Staff. He graduated in 1892 at the first level, and on May 6, 1892, for success in the science of artillery was promoted to the captains' headquarters. He was appointed to the headquarters of the Vilna Military District.

On November 26, 1892, he was appointed senior aide at the headquarters of the 2nd Cavalry Division. On April 17, 1894, he was promoted to captain. From October 1, 1897, to October 1, 1894, he was stationed at Cenzovoe Command with a squadron in the 6th LEJB-Dragoon Positive Regiment. Promoted on April 18, 1899, Lieutenant Colonel Volodchenko was appointed at the same time as the senior aide at the headquarters of the Vilna Military District.

On January 16, 1901, he was a headquarters officer assigned to the commander of the Vilna Military District. From May 9 to November 9, 1902, he was seconded to the 6th LEJB-Dragunskomu Pavlohrad Regiment to familiarize himself with the general requirements of the management and maintenance of the Hozjajstvava. On July 20, 1902, he was appointed as chief of staff of the 2nd Cavalry Division and promoted to the rank of colonel on April 6 of the following year.

=== Active military career ===
After the outbreak of the war with Japan, Volodchenko went to the active army where he was the commander of the 2nd Manchurian Army. For the fighting in the villages of Maturan and Madepu he was awarded the Order of St. Vladimir 4th degree with swords and bow and gold weapons with the inscription "For courage". At the end of the hostilities, Volodchenko was transferred to a separate corps of the Border Guard on October 27, 1905, and was appointed to the post of chief of staff of the SACB district of the area in the region. On July 14, 1909, he was promoted to Major General.

Before the outbreak of World War I, in the mobilization, Volodchenko was appointed commander of the Brigade of the 3rd Don Cossack Division on August 2, 1914. In November he became commander of the fighting division itself. From April 26, 1915 he was the commander (later chief) of the 16th Cavalry Division. During the Gorlickogo battle and the breakthrough of the Austro-German forces under General August von Mackensen at Tarnow in April 1915, Volodchenko led the Combined Cavalry Corps of the 3rd Army. For his military service on June 16, 1915, he was promoted to lieutenant general (with seniority from November 24, 1914). On May 19, 1915, Volodchenko was awarded the Order of St. George 4 Degree

For his outstanding diligence, courage and dedication during his successful command of the third Don Cossack Division, part of the Integrated Cavalry Corps, in the battles of November 4–24, 1914, at Gribova, New Sandeca, near Limanowa, Tymbarka, Porobka, Mt. St. Jana and Lapanuva, he was assigned to the Equestrian Corps.

On April 7, 1917, Volodchenko was appointed commander of the 46 Army Corps. On September 9, 1917, he replaced General F. Ogorodnikov as commander-in-chief of the South-Western Front.

The day after the October Revolution, Volodchenko joined the front committee for the salvation of the revolution. On November 5 he signed the Berdichev Agreement with the Ukrainian Central Rada, but on November 24 he left the command in Odessa.

In 1919, Volodchenko left for the Far East, first in the Eastern Front army, then as chief of the internal security of the KVZhD (Chinese Eastern Railway) police. He lived in Harbin, China and published several articles in the largest journal for Russian immigrants The Hour.

On September 24, 1945, he was arrested by SMERSH authorities on charges of anti-Soviet activities and died at the end of the year in custody during the investigation. On November 22, 1999, the Prosecutor's Office of the Omsk region posthumously rehabilitated him.

His twin grandsons are Mikhail and Nikolai Volodchenko who have died however still living Mikhail's daughter Irene and her children, his son Michael died. Nickolai's daughter Irene and her daughter still living.

== Awards ==
- Order of St. Stanislaus 3rd degree (1894)
- Order of St. Anne 3rd degree (1898)
- Order of St. Stanislaus 2nd degree (1901)
- Order of St. Anne 2nd degree (1906)
- Order of St. Vladimir 4th degree, with swords and Bow (1906)
- Gold weapons with the inscription "For Bravery" (16 March 1906)
- Order of St. Vladimir 3rd degree (1907)
- Order of St. Stanislaus 1st degree (April 14, 1913)
- Order of St. Anne 1st degree with Swords (13 January 1915)
- Order of St. George, 4th degree (19 May 1915)

Preceded by Fyodor Ogorodnikov	Commander of the Southwestern Front; September 9 – November 24, 1917	Succeeded by Nikolai Stogov

== Sources ==
- Wolves generals the Russian Empire. Encyclopedic a dictionary of generals and admirals from Peter I to Nicholas II. Tom I. A-C.-M., 2009. -C. 287. -ISBN 978-5-9524-4166-8
- Wolves c. Russian military emigration. Publishing activities. -M., 2008. -c. 245.
- The highest orders of the military department. To the Scout No. 1290. -C. 771
- Ganin A. Corps of General staff officers in the years of the Civil War of 1917-1922 Reference material. -M., 2009. -C. 188, 424. -ISBN 978-5-85887-301-3
- Ismailov E. Gold weapons with the inscription "For courage". List of Knights of 1788-1913. -M. 2007. -c. 373, 527.
- Zaleski C. A. Who was in the First World War. -M., 2003. -c. 127-128
- Russian border Service: encyclopedia. Biography. -M., 2008. -C. 97-98
- Scout. -February 17, 1915-No. 1267
- List of generals by the rank. It was drafted on April 15, 1914. -St. Petersburg, 1914. -C. 575
- List of generals by the rank. Revised July 10, 1916-Ng, 1916. -c. 49
