= 21st Armoured Brigade (Greece) =

21st Armoured Brigade "Pindus Cavalry"
- XXI Τεθωρακισμένη Ταξιαρχία «Ταξιαρχία Ιππικού Πίνδος»
- Emblem of the 21st Armoured Brigade
- Active: 1970–today
- Country: Greece
- Branch: Hellenic Army
- Type: Armoured
- Size: 5 Battalions
- Part of: 16th Mechanized Infantry Division (Greece)
- Garrison/HQ: Komotini, Western Thrace
- Motto(s): Not how many, but where Ου πόσοι αλλά που Ou posi alla pou

The 21st Armoured Brigade "Pindus Cavalry" (Greek: XXI Τεθωρακισμένη Ταξιαρχία «Ταξιαρχία Ιππικού Πίνδος», XXI ΤΘΤ) is a tank formation of the Hellenic Army, based in Komotini, Western Thrace.

== History ==
The 21st Armoured Brigade was planned in 1968, but delays in acquiring the necessary equipment meant that it began forming at Litochoro on 1 December 1970, and was moved to the Komotini-Alexandroupoli area in September 1971. Upon the completion of its formation in 1971, the Brigade comprised the 211th and 212th Medium Tank Battalions (211 & 212 ΕΜΑ), the 21st Reconnaissance Company (21 ΙΛΑΝ), and various support companies.

From 1977 on, all its sub-units have been concentrated at Komotini. On 1 December 2000, it received the honorific title "Pindus Cavalry Brigade".

== Structure ==
21st Armoured Brigade "Pindus Cavalry"

- HQ Company (ΙΣΤ)
- 211th Medium Tank Battalion (211 ΕΜΑ)
- 212th Medium Tank Battalion (212 ΕΜΑ)
- 646 Mechanized Infantry Battalion (646 M/K ΤΠ)
- 140 Self Propelled Artillery Battalion (140 Α/K ΜΠΒ)
- 21st Engineer Company (21 ΛΜΧ)
- 21st Signal Company (21 ΛΔΒ)
- 21st Support Battalion (21 ΕΥΠ)
