= 30th Mechanized Infantry Brigade (Greece) =

30th Mechanized Infantry Brigade "Tomoritsa"
- 30η Μηχανοκίνητη Ταξίαρχια "Τομορίτσα"
- Emblem of the 30th Mechanized Infantry Brigade
- Country: Greece
- Branch: Hellenic Army
- Type: mechanized infantry
- Size: 5 battalions
- Part of: 16th Mechanized Infantry Division
- Garrison/HQ: Lagos, Western Thrace
- Motto: I will defend my country even being alone (Αμύνω δε και μόνος)

The 30th Mechanized Infantry Brigade ("Tomoritsa") is a unit of the Hellenic Army based in Lagos, Western Thrace.

== Structure ==
- HQ Company (ΙΣΤ)
- 30th Signal Company (30 ΛΔΒ)
- 30th Engineer Company (30 ΛΜΧ)
- 16th Armored Battalion (16 ΕΜΑ)
- 516th Mechanized Infantry Battalion (516 M/K ΤΠ)
- 564th Mechanized Infantry Battalion (564 M/K ΤΠ)
- 565th Infantry Battalion (565 ΤΠ)
- 129th Self Propelled Artillery Battalion (129 Μ Α/K ΠΒ)
- 30th Antitank Company (30 ΛΑΤ)
- 30th Support Battalion (30 ΤΥΠ)
