= 3rd Army Corps (Russian Empire) =

Army Corps of the Russian Empire

- Active: 1877–1918
- Country: Russian Empire
- Branch: (Russian Empire) Imperial Russian Army
- Size: ~20,000
- HQ: Vilnius
- Engagements: Russo-Turkish War (1877–78); First World War; Eastern Front; Battle of Tannenberg

The 3rd Army Corps was an Army corps in the Imperial Russian Army formed on 19 February 1877.

Its headquarters were in Vilnius.

== Composition ==
The Army Corps composition as of 18 July 1914, at the outbreak of the First World War, was:

- 25th Infantry Division headquartered at Dvinsk
  - 1st Brigade
    - 97th Livonia Infantry Regiment (headquarters Dvinsk)
    - 98th Yuriev Infantry Regiment (headquarters Dvinsk)
  - 2nd Brigade (headquarters Dvinsk)
    - 99th Ivangorod Infantry Regiment (headquarters Dvinsk)
    - 100th Ostrovsky Infantry Regiment (headquarters Dvinsk)
  - 25th Artillery Brigade
- 27th Infantry Division (headquarters Vilnius)
  - 1st Brigade
    - 105th Orenburg Infantry Regiment
    - 106th Ufa Infantry Regiment
  - 2nd Brigade
    - 107th Troitsky Infantry Regiment
    - 108th Saratov Infantry Regiment
  - 27th Artillery Brigade
- 5th Rifle Brigade
  - 17th Rifle Regiment
  - 18th Rifle Regiment
  - 19th Rifle Regiment
  - 20th Rifle Regiment
  - 5th Rifle Artillery Division
- 3rd Cavalry Division (headquarters Kaunas)
  - 1st Cavalry Brigade
    - 3rd Novorossiysk Dragoon Regiment
    - 3rd Smolensk Uhlan Regiment
  - 2nd Cavalry Brigade
    - 3rd Elisavetgradsky Hussar Regiment
    - 3rd Don Cossack Regiment
  - 3rd Horse Artillery Battalion
    - 5th Horse Artillery Battery
    - 6th Horse Artillery Battery
- 3rd Mortar-Artillery Division
- 3rd Sapper Battalion
- 4th Pontoon Battalion
- 2nd Telegraph Company
- 9th Aeronautical Company
- 3rd Howitzer Artillery Battalion

== Part of ==
- 1st Army: 2 August – 10 October 1914
- 10th Army: 22 October 1914 – 4 May 1915
- 5th Army: 8 June 1915 – 21 May 1916
- 4th Army: 1 June 1916 – 20 June 1916
- 3rd Army: 1 July 1916 – 1 April 1917
- 10th Army: 1 May 1917 – December 1917

== Personnel ==
=== Commanders ===
No.	Portrait	Commander	Took office	Left office	Time in office
1	Karl-Andrey Efimovich Den [ru]	Lieutenant-General; Karl-Andrey Efimovich Den	19 February 1877	23 April 1878	1 year, 63 days
2	Karl Eduard von Möller [ru]	Lieutenant-General; Karl Eduard von Möller	4 May 1878	5 August 1878	93 days
3	Eduard Karlovich Dellingshausen	Lieutenant-General; Eduard Karlovich Dellingshausen	15 August 1878	1885	6 years, 139 days
4	Yakov Kaihosrovich Alkhazov [ru]	Lieutenant-General; Yakov Kaihosrovich Alkhazov	6 July 1885	19 October 1894	9 years, 105 days
5	Viktor Ivanovich Dmitrovsky [ru]	Lieutenant-General; Viktor Ivanovich Dmitrovsky	28 October 1894	1 January 1898	3 years, 65 days
6	Vasily Nikolaevich Maksimovich [ru]	Lieutenant-General; General of the Infantry after 6 December 1898; Vasily Nikolaevich Maksimovich	1 January 1898	29 May 1899	1 year, 148 days
7	Mitrofan Tchaikovsky	Lieutenant-General; General of the Infantry after 1 January 1901; Mitrofan Tchaikovsky	6 November 1899	25 March 1903	3 years, 139 days
8	Konstantin Iosifovich Razgonov	Lieutenant-General; Konstantin Iosifovich Razgonov	16 April 1903	22 June 1904	1 year, 67 days
9	Aleksandr Eduardovich Prescott [ru]	Lieutenant-General; Aleksandr Eduardovich Prescott	22 June 1904	16 December 1904	177 days
10	Ivan Vasilievich Volkenau	Lieutenant-General; Ivan Vasilievich Volkenau	12 January 1905	5 December 1906	1 year, 327 days
11	Paul von Rennenkampf	Lieutenant-General; General of the Infantry after 6 December 1910; Paul von Rennenkampf	27 December 1906	20 January 1913	6 years, 24 days
12	Nikolai Epanchin	Lieutenant-General; General of the Infantry after 4 April 1913; Nikolai Epanchin	29 January 1913	6 February 1915	2 years, 8 days
13	Aleksandr Aleksandrovich Zegelov [ru]	Lieutenant-General; General of the Infantry after 22 March 1915; Aleksandr Aleksandrovich Zegelov	14 February 1915	22 August 1915	189 days
14	Vladimir Alekseyevich Alftan	Lieutenant-General; Vladimir Alekseyevich Alftan	22 August 1915	16 April 1916	238 days
15	Pyotr Oganovsky	General of the Infantry; Pyotr Oganovsky	16 April 1916	11 September 1916	148 days
16	Grigory Yanushevsky [ru]	Lieutenant-General; Grigory Yanushevsky	11 September 1916	3 April 1917	204 days
17	Dmitry Nadyozhny	Major-General; Lieutenant-General after 29 April 1917; Dmitry Nadyozhny	7 April 1917	12 October 1917	188 days
18	Boris Dzichkanets [ru]	Lieutenant-General; Boris Dzichkanets	22 October 1917		

=== Chiefs of Staff ===
- 24 February 1877 – 15 May 1885 — Colonel (Major-General after 1 January 1878) Aleksandr Fyodorovich Kozen
- 15 May 1885 – 9 December 1892 — Major-General Ivan Ivanovich Tyvalovich
- 11 January 1893 – 5 January 1898 — Major-General Stanislav Stanislavovich Novogrebelsky
- 5 January 1898 – 20 October 1899 — Major-General Nikolai Nilovich Lavrov
- 2 November 1899 – 17 February 1904 — Major-General Aleksandr Konstantinovich Petrov
- 24 March 1904 – 12 October 1904 — Major-General Nikolai Sergeyevich Berdyaev
- 22 October 1904 – 16 June 1906 — Major-General Alexander Frantsevich Ragoza
- 23 July 1906 – July 1908 — Major-General Baron Aleksandr Georgyevich Ikskul-von-Gildebant
- 9 July 1908 – 19 October 1914 — Major-General Vladimir Aleksandrovich Chagin
- 14 December 1914 – 17 July 1915 — Major-General Viktor Viktorovich Eggert
- 18 July 1915 – 7 February 1917 — Major-General Nikolai Dimitryevich Chausov
- 8 February 1917 – 4 May 1917 — Major-General Vladimir Nikolayevich Yegoryev
- 12 May 1917 – 7 August 1917 — Major-General Mikhail Vasilyevich Lebedev
- 12 August 1917 – 1918 — Major-General Andrey Nikolayevich Suvorov

=== Chiefs of Artillery ===
- 19 March 1877 – 5 December 1889 — Major-General (Lieutenant-General from 30 August 1881) Yakov Mikhailovich Kostogorov
- 9 January 1890 – 4 February 1893 — Major-General (Lieutenant-General from 30 August 1892) Aleksandr Nikitich Fedortsov-Malysh
- 4 February 1893 – 19 January 1898 — Lieutenant-General Aleksandr Nikolayevich Skvortso
- 19 January 1898 – 10 April 1901 — Major-General (Lieutenant-General from 5 April 1898) Dmitry Andreyevich Topornin
- 30 May 1901 – 9 July 1906 — Major-General (Lieutenant-General from 12 June 1903) Aleksey Stepanovich Shepilov
- 25 July 1906 – 26 October 1913 — Major-General (Lieutenant-General from 22 April 1907) Dmitry Ivanovich Nevadovsky
- 18 December 1913 – 16 April 1916 — Major-General (Lieutenant-General from 12 June 1914) Count Viktor Viktorovich Dolivo-Dobrovolsky-Yevdokimov
- 13 May 1916 – 18 February 1917 — Major-General Konstantin Konstantinovich Pilkin
- From 18 February 1917 — Major-General Ivan Nikanorovich Andreyev

=== Corps quartermasters ===
- 17 February 1898 – 19 July 1900 — Colonel Viktor Ivanovich Lang
- 23 July 1900 – 1905 — State Councillor Mikhail Ivanovich Levandovsky
- 13 November 1905 – 8 August 1910 — Lieutenant-Colonel (Colonel from 12 June 1906) Zenon Avgustinovich Vorotnitsky
- 16 August 1910 – after 1 March 1914 — Lieutenant-Colonel (Colonel from 14 April 1913) Aleksandr Mikhailovich Vishnyakov

== See also ==
- List of Imperial Russian Army formations and units
