= Mitrofan Tchaikovsky =

Russian infantry general

Mitrofan Petrovich Tchaikovsky
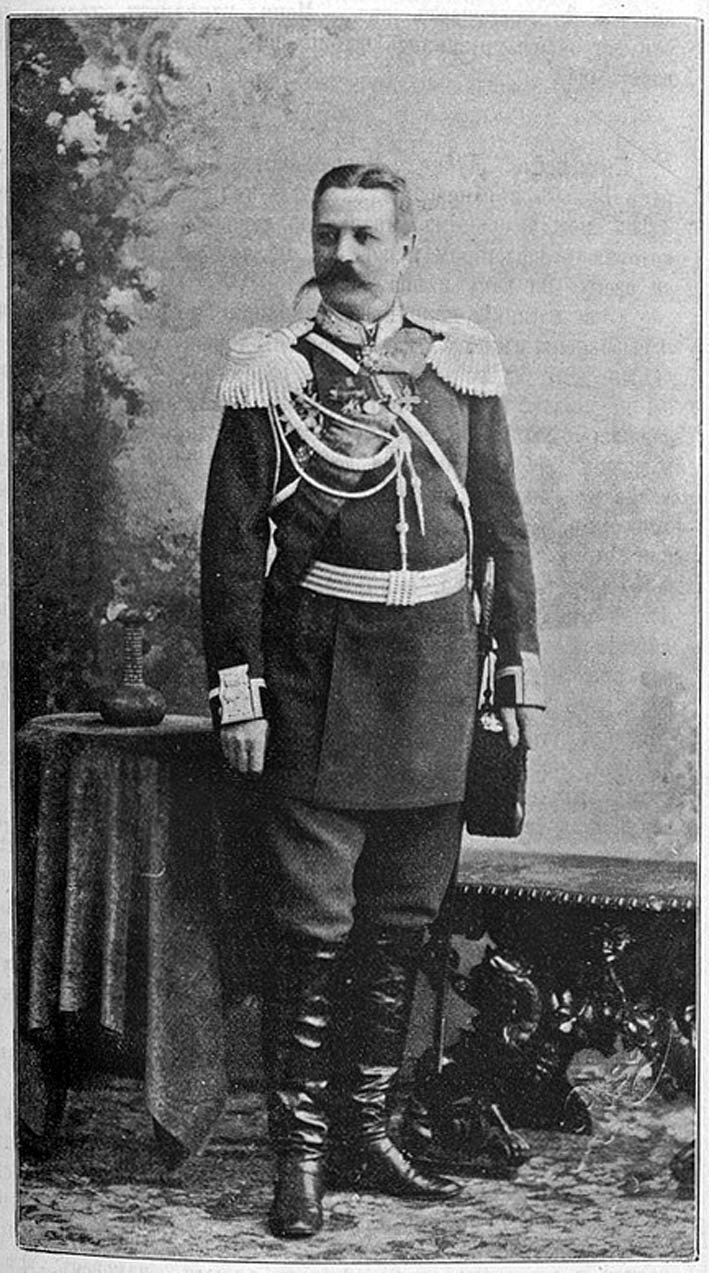
- Born: 7 April 1840
- Died: 25 March 1903 (aged 62); St. Petersburg, Russian Empire
- Military career
- Allegiance: Russian Empire
- Branch: Imperial Russian Army
- Rank: general
- Unit: 29th Infantry Division (Russian Empire)
- Conflicts: Khivan campaign of 1873; Russo-Turkish War

Mitrofan Petrovich Tchaikovsky (7 April 1840 – 25 March 1903) was an infantry general, commandant of the Ivangorod fortress, commander of the 3rd Army Corps (Russian Empire).

== Biography ==
Tchaikovsky was born on 7 April 1840. He was educated in the 1st Moscow Cadet Corps, from which he was released on 30 June 1858 as an ensign in the Life Guards Finland Regiment. 30 March 1859 was promoted to second lieutenant, and already 29 May of the same year - on a lieutenant. 21 March 1860 promoted to headquarters captain.

Since 7 May 1861, Tchaikovsky was a senior adjutant to the headquarters of the assistant inspector of infantry battalions, and on 6 June of the following year he was promoted to captain. In the same year, he successfully passed the entrance exams to the Nikolaev Academy of the General Staff. At the end of the course at the academy on 10 December 1864 he was appointed senior adjutant to the headquarters of the 3rd Cavalry Division (Russian Empire), and then successively held the position of senior adjutant in the interim administration of the Warsaw Guard detachment (3 July 1866) and was on assignments at the headquarters of the Warsaw Military District (from 31 July 1867).

On 7 December 1868, Tchaikovsky was transferred to Turkestan and appointed to be at the disposal of the Turkestan Governor-General, Adjutant General K.P. Kaufman (at the same time, he was formally classified as a weapon without a position). From 5 May 1869 he was an assistant to the Issyk-Kul district chief, on 14 March 1870 he was appointed head of this county and on 19 November of the same year he was transferred to the same position in Tokmak district.

From 16 June 1872 to 14 August 1874 he commanded the 4th Turkestan Line Battalion, with which in 1873 he took part in an expedition against the Khanate of Khiva. For military distinctions in this campaign he was awarded the orders of St. Stanislav 2nd degree with the imperial crown and swords and St. 4th degree Vladimir with swords and bow. Then he was promoted to colonel.

On 10 April 1875, Tchaikovsky was appointed to the post of chief of staff of the 29th Infantry Division, and on 21 August 1877 he took the same position in the 3rd Grenadier Division (Russian Empire). He took part in the Russo-Turkish War (1877-78). For military distinctions he was awarded a golden saber with the inscription "For courage".

At the end of the war, on 13 August 1878 he was appointed commander of the 58th Infantry Regiment of Prague, from 28 March 1879 he commanded the 4th Grenadier Nesvizh Regiment.

On 23 September 1879 was promoted to major general and enlisted in the army infantry and reserve troops, was seconded to the General Staff.

On 24 March 1881 he was appointed commander of the 2nd brigade of the 39th Infantry Division (Russian Empire), from 2 September 1882 he commanded the 1st brigade of the Caucasus Grenadier Division (Russian Empire).

On 2 August 1884, Tchaikovsky was appointed chief of staff of the 6th Army Corps (Russian Empire) and remained in that position until 22 February 1889, when he was appointed assistant chief of staff of the Kiev Military District. 28 November 1889 received the command of the 2nd Infantry Brigade.

On 30 August 1890 he was promoted to lieutenant general, on 22 June of the following year he was appointed commandant of the Ivangorod fortress, and on 13 June 1899 he was given command of the 3rd Army Corps (Russian Empire). On 1 January 1901, he was promoted to general of Infantry (with seniority of 6 December 1900).

He died on 25 March 1903 in St. Petersburg.

He was buried at the Nikolskoe Cemetery of the Alexander Nevsky Lavra.

== Awards ==
Among other awards, Tchaikovsky had orders:

- Order of St. Anna, 3rd degree (1866)
- Order of St. Stanislav 2nd degree with the imperial crown and swords (1873)
- Order of St. Vladimir 4th degree with swords and bow (1874)
- Order of St. Vladimir 3rd degree (1877)
- Golden saber with the inscription "For courage" (29 July 1878)
- Order of St. Stanislav 1st degree (1881)
- Order of St. Anna 1st degree (1886)
- Order of St. Vladimir, 2nd degree (30 August 1893)
- Order of the White Eagle (14 May 1896)

== Family ==
Grandfather - Pyotr Fedorovich Tchaikovsky (1745-1818). Wife - Anastasia Stepanovna, née Posokhova (born 1751).

Father - Tchaikovsky, Pyotr Petrovich (1789-1871) - retired major general. The elder brother of Ilya Petrovich Tchaikovsky (1795-1880), the father of the great Russian composer Pyotr Ilyich Tchaikovsky.

Mother - Evdokia Petrovna Berens (Elizabeth von Beren).

Brothers and sisters:

- Anna (1830-1911)
- Sofia (1833-1888)
- Alexandra (1836-1899)
- Ilya (1837-1891)
- Lydia (1838-1901)
- Hope (born 1841). Spouse - S. A. Porokhovshchikov (died 1888).
- Andrey (1841-1920) - infantry general, governor of the Ferghana region.

== Sources ==
- Volkov S.V. Generality of the Russian Empire. Encyclopedic dictionary of generals and admirals from Peter I to Nicholas II. Volume II L — I. - M., 2009. - S. 693. - ISBN 978-5-9524-4167-5
- Ismailov E.E. Golden weapon with the inscription "For courage." Lists of gentlemen 1788-1913. - M., 2007. - S. 314, 522. - ISBN 978-5-903473-05-2
- "Scout". - 7 September 1899. - No. 464. - S. 753.
- List to the generals by seniority. Corrected on 1 April 1880. - SPb., 1880. - S. 1018
- List to the generals by seniority. Done on 1 January 1903. - SPb., 1903. - S. 126.

Military offices
Preceded by	Chief of Staff of the 29th Infantry Division; 1875-1876	Succeeded by
