= 16th Group =

16th Group may refer to:

- 16th Carrier Air Group, a formation of the United Kingdom Royal Navy
- 16th Military Police Brigade (United States), a unit of the United States Army
- 16th Air Expeditionary Wing (16th Bombardment Group), a unit of the United States Air Force
- Chalocgens, 16th group of the Periodic Table

== See also ==
- 16th Army (disambiguation)
- 16th Wing (disambiguation)
- 16th Division (disambiguation)
- 16th Brigade (disambiguation)
- 16th Regiment (disambiguation)
- 16th Squadron (disambiguation)
