= Viktor Danilovich Krenke =

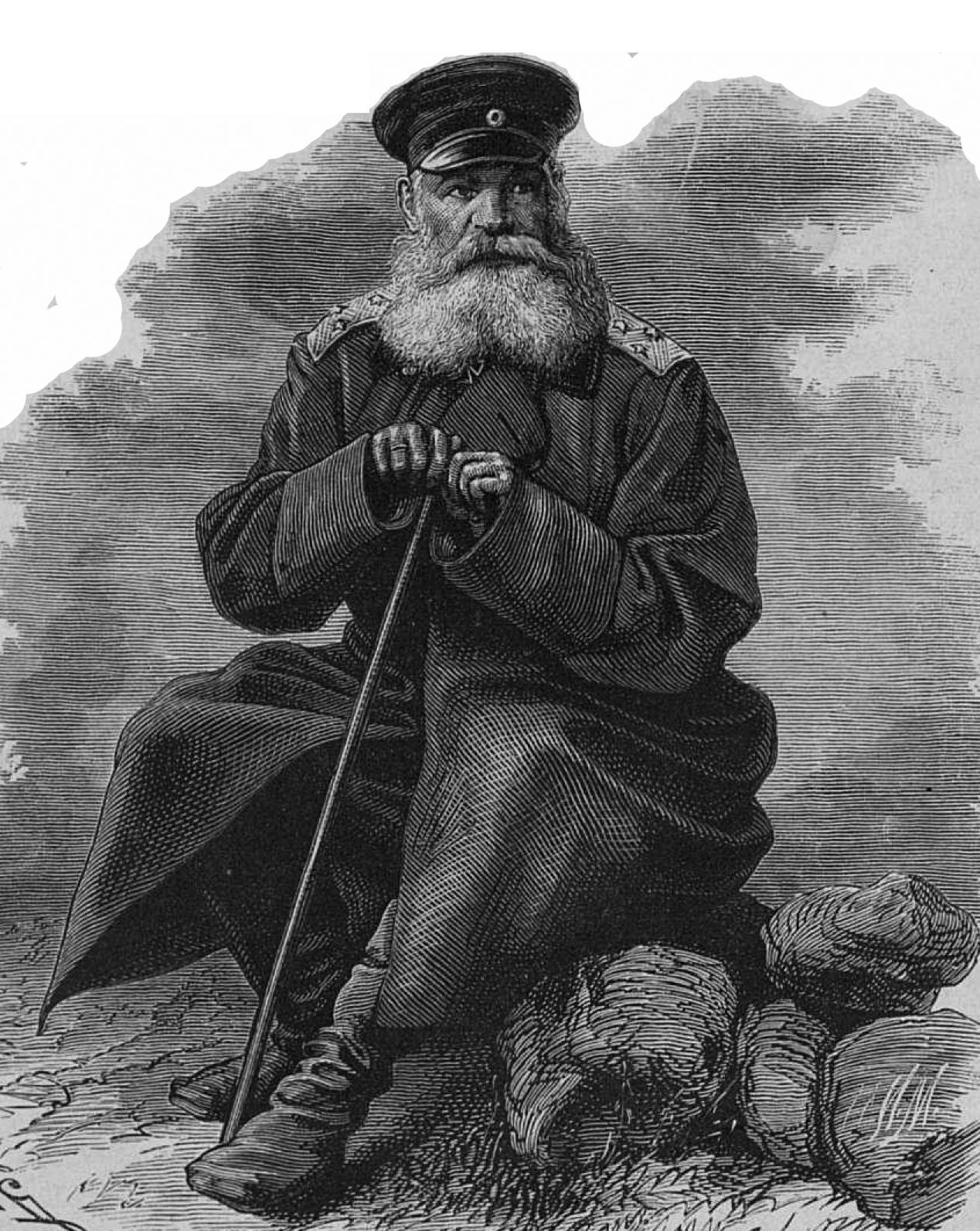
- Born: June 13, 1816
- Died: May 31, 1893 (aged 76)
- Allegiance: Russian Empire
- Branch: Imperial Russian Army
- Rank: lieutenant general
- Commands: 26th Infantry Division (Russian Empire)
- Conflicts: Russo-Turkish War

Viktor Danilovich Krenke (13 June 1816 – 31 May 1893) was a Russian military engineer, participant in the Russo-Turkish War (1877–78), lieutenant general, and writer in the field of agriculture.

== Biography ==
Born on 13 June 1816, he came from the nobility of the Novgorod province. A pupil of the Pavlovsk cadet corps, from which he was released in 1834 into the Grenadier engineer battalion, where he was until 1850, and then was at the disposal of the chief of engineers of the Guards and Grenadier corps.Already at the beginning of his service, Krenke drew attention to himself by tireless activity and management during the performance of the work entrusted to him and has repeatedly been honored with the personal highest favors.

In 1855, Krenke was appointed commander of a training sapper battalion and at the same time was sent to supervise the work on putting the Vyborg fortress into a defensive position on the occasion of the Eastern War.

On 22 July 1860 he was promoted to major general and appointed chief of the 2nd engineer brigade; in 1864 - the district quartermaster of the Petersburg military district, on 21 July 1866 - the head of the 26th infantry division, on 30 August 1867 he was promoted to lieutenant general. In 1869, a painful condition forced him to go to the reserve of the engineering corps, but with the declaration of the Russian-Turkish war in 1877, Krenke, of his own free will, was assigned to the army at the disposal of the commander-in-chief. On 9 July he was sent on a mission to explore the path and lay the road through the Shipka Pass; Despite the extreme difficulty of gathering and keeping local residents at work, Krenke managed from 14 July to 7 August to arrange an 11-verst highway along the Shipka Uplift and partly even along the southern slope of the Balkans. When Russian troops occupied Shipka, Krenke joined this detachment, led the defensive work from 7 to 9 August, and then the Shipka defense itself (until 11 August); for the courage and management shown at the same time, he was awarded the Order of St. Vladimir, 2nd degree. On 8 September 1878 Krenke was awarded the Order of St. George 4th degree: “For bravery and management in battles at the Shipka position: 9, 10 and 11 August 1877. "

With the arrival of General Radetzky on Shipka, Krenke went to Gabrovo to put it in a defensive state and build a road from Gabrovo to Shipka. From 22 August to 18 September he was for assignments at the Main Apartment, and then he was entrusted with the head of all work to keep the communication lines in good working order in the area occupied by the Russian army in Bulgaria; here he showed his inherent indefatigable energy and special diligence in the struggle against the most difficult working conditions in a rainy autumn and a harsh snowy winter.

At the end of the war, he was appointed head of military communications in Bulgaria; at the same time, he was entrusted with the main supervision over the evacuation of Russian troops from Burgas, and then from Ruschuk and Silistria.

In June 1879, Krenke was re-enlisted in the reserve troops in the engineering corps. Returning to his estate in the Tikhvin district, he turned exclusively to agriculture; compiled an agricultural encyclopedia: "On Agriculture" (1868; went through several reprints). In addition, Krenke wrote a popular pamphlet: Potatoes, How They Benefit and How to Handle them (1884).

From the military-literary works of Krenke, the following compositions are known: "The Defense of the Baltic Coast in 1854-56." (1887); "Memoirs" ("Historical Bulletin", August 1893); in addition, he was an employee of the "Engineering Journal". Krenke died on 31 May 1893 (excluded from the lists by the deceased by the Highest order on military ranks on 28 June), his widow Alexandra Alexandrovna - on 4 July 1899; the Krenke spouses are buried in the Kolbetsky churchyard of the Tikhvin district of the Novgorod province (now the village of Kolbeki in the Boksitogorsky municipal district of the Leningrad region).

== Awards ==
For his service, Krenke was awarded many orders, including:

- Order of St. Anna, 2nd degree (1848; the Imperial crown to this order was granted in 1850)
- Order of St. Vladimir, 4th degree (1856)
- Order of St. Stanislaus, 2nd class with the Imperial crown (1858)
- Order of St. Vladimir 3rd degree (1863)
- Order of St. Stanislaus 1st degree (1864)
- Order of St. Anna 1st degree (1866)
- Order of St. Vladimir, 2nd class with swords (1877)
- Order of Saint George 4th degree (September 8, 1878)
- Order of the White Eagle (1879)

Military offices
Preceded by Alexander Semyonovich Kovalevsky	Commander of the 26th Infantry Division; 1866-1869	Succeeded by Eduard Karlovich Dellingshausen

== Bibliography ==
- Быт саперов 50 лет назад. (Отрывок из воспоминаний генерал-лейтенанта В.Д. Кренке) // Исторический вестник, 1885. — Т. 21. — № 8. — С. 265-294.
- Быт саперов двадцать пять лет назад // Исторический вестник, 1886. — Т. 26. — № 10. — С. 85-120.
- “Cadet life of the twenties - thirties. 1826 - 1834 "ч. 1, ч. 2

== Sources ==
- Volkov S.V. Generality of the Russian Empire. Encyclopedic Dictionary of Generals and Admirals from Peter I to Nicholas II. Volume I. A - K. - M., 2009. - S. 718. - ISBN 978-5-9524-4166-8
- Krasnitsky A.I. Under the Russian banner. A story-chronicle of the liberation war of 1877–1878. - SPb.— M., 1902.
- Krenke, Viktor Danilovich // Military encyclopedia: [in 18 volumes] / ed. VF Novitsky ... [and others]. - SPb.; [M.]: Type. t-va I. D. Sytin, 1911–1915.
- Krenke, Viktor Danilovich // Brockhaus and Efron Encyclopedic Dictionary: in 86 volumes (82 volumes and 4 additional). - SPb., 1890–1907.
- List of generals by seniority. Corrected to 13 March 1861. - SPb., 1861. - S. 686. The same. Corrected on August 1, 1872. - SPb., 1872. - P. 400. The same. Corrected until September 1, 1879 .-- SPb., 1879 .-- P. 258.
- Editorial office of the journal. Lieutenant General V. D. Krenke // Illustrated Chronicle of War. Supplement to the "World Illustration": magazine. - 1878. - No. 88. - P. 299.
