= 16th Mechanized Infantry Division (Greece) =

16th Mechanized Infantry Division "Didymoteicho"
- XVI Μηχανοκίνητη Μεραρχία Πεζικού "ΔΙΔΥΜΟΤΕΙΧΟ"
- Camp flag of the 16th Mechanized Infantry Division
- Active: 1915/16-1917; 1940-1941; 1975-present
- Country: Greece
- Branch: Hellenic Army
- Type: Mechanized infantry
- Size: Division
- Part of: IV Army Corps
- Garrison/HQ: Didymoteicho, Western Thrace
- Mottos: We Shall All Die Willingly πᾶντες αὐτοπροαιρέτως ἀποθανοῦμεν pantes aftoproeretos apothanoumen
- Engagements: World War I: Macedonian front; World War II: Greco-Italian War; Battle of Greece

The 16th Mechanized Infantry Division "Didymoteicho" (Greek: XVI Μηχανοκίνητη Μεραρχία Πεζικού "ΔΙΔΥΜΟΤΕΙΧΟ", romanized: XVI Mikhanokíniti Merarkhía Pezikoú "Didymótikho") is a mechanized infantry division of the Hellenic Army.

== History ==
=== World War I ===
The 16th Infantry Division was formed for the first time in late 1915 or early 1916, following the Greek mobilization on 10 September 1915, in response to the mobilization of Bulgaria. It comprised the 46th, 47th, and 48th Infantry Regiments, and was part of the V Army Corps. In June 1916, it was transferred to Northern Epirus, with headquarters at Argyrokastron and the regiments based at Korytsa, Argyrokastron, and Premeti respectively. The division was withdrawn south following the Italian occupation of the area in autumn 1916. In April 1917, along with the rest of the Hellenic Army still loyal to the royal government in Athens, it was withdrawn to the Peloponnese at the insistence of the Entente powers. Its final base was at Pyrgos, Elis, where it was disbanded shortly after.

=== World War II ===
At the commencement of the Greco-Italian War in October 1940, it was reactivated in Lamia as a brigade but was quickly expanded to a division-strength by the end of the year and placed under the command of the Western Macedonia Army Section (III Army Corps). The 16th Division took part in operations against Italian forces throughout the campaign, capturing Hill 601 near Tseritsa on 10 February 1941, holding the line against repeated Italian attacks in the Tomoritsa Sector, and capturing Teke Hill on 31 March 1941 by bayonet charge. The division was disbanded in Agrinio, for a second time, in May 1941, after the German invasion of Greece.

=== Post-war period ===
In 1965, the 99th Military Command (Greek: 99 Στρατιωτική Διοίκηση, 99 ΣΔΙ, romanized: 99 Stratiotikí Diíkisi, 99 SDI) was formed in the town of Didymoteicho. It was expanded and renamed in 1975 to the 16th Infantry Division (Greek: XVI Μεραρχία Πεζικού, XVI ΜΠ, romanized: XVI Merarkhía Pezikoú, XVI MP). The division was reorganized in 2009 as a mechanized infantry division and given the title of "Didymoteicho" to honor its long association with the garrison town.

== Emblem and motto ==
The emblem of the 16th Mechanized Infantry Division is the double-headed eagle of the Byzantine Empire, standing guard on the walls of Constantinople.

The division's motto is "We Shall All Die Willingly" (Greek: πᾶντες αὐτοπροαιρέτως ἀποθανοῦμεν, romanized: pádes aftoproerétos apothanoúmen). The phrase is attributed to Constantine XI Palaiologos, the last reigning Byzantine Emperor. According to the historian Doukas, before the beginning of the siege of Constantinople in 1453, the Ottoman Sultan Mehmed II made an offer to Constantine XI. In exchange for the surrender of Constantinople, the emperor's life would be spared and he would continue to rule in Mistra. Constantine answered, "To surrender the city to you is neither my right, nor any of its inhabitants, because it is our decision that, in its defence, we shall all die willingly and we shall not lament our death" (Greek: "Το δέ τήν πόλιν σοί δοῦναι οὔτ' ἐμόν ἐστί οὔτ' ἄλλου τῶν κατοικούντων ἐν ταύτῃ· κοινή γάρ γνώμη πᾶντες αὐτοπροαιρέτως ἀποθανοῦμεν καί οὐ φεισόμεθα τῆς ζωῆς ἡμῶν").

== Organization ==
Locations of 16th Mechanized Infantry Division units

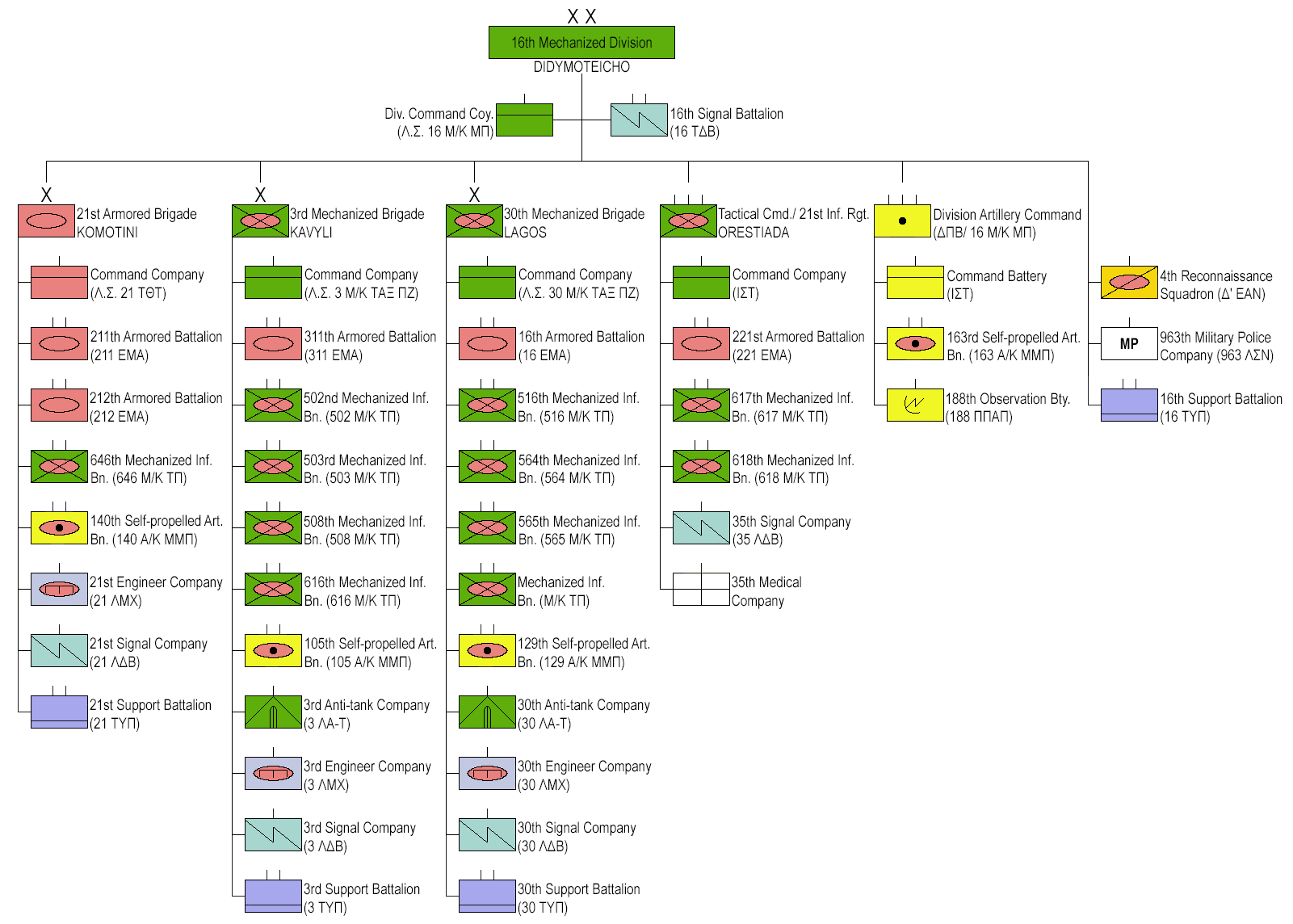
Structure of the 16th Mechanized Infantry Division

- Division HQ Company (ΛΣ/XVI Μ/Κ ΜΠ)
- 4th Armoured Cavalry Squadron (Δ' ΕΑΝ)
- 16th Support Battalion
- 16th Signal Company (16ο ΛΔΒ)
- 963th Military Police Company
- Tactical Command/21st Infantry Regiment "Drama" (ΤΔ/21ο ΣΠ "Δράμα"), based at Orestiada, Thrace
  - HQ Company (ΙΣΤ)
  - 35th Signal Company (35 ΛΔΒ)
  - 221st Armored Battalion (221 ΕΜΑ)
  - 617th Mechanized Infantry Battalion (617 M/K ΤΠ)
  - 618th Mechanized Infantry Battalion (618 M/K ΤΠ)
  - 35th Medical Company (35 ΛΔΒ)
- Division Artillery Command (ΔΠΒ/XVI Μ/Κ ΜΠ)
  - HQ Company
  - 163rd Self Propelled Artillery Battalion (163 Μ Α/K ΠΒ)
  - 188th Observation Battery (188 ΠΠΑΡ)
- 3rd Mechanized Infantry Brigade, based at Kavyli, Thrace
  - HQ Company (ΙΣΤ)
  - 311th Armored Battalion (311 ΕΜΑ)
  - 502nd Mechanized Infantry Battalion (502 M/K ΤΠ)
  - 503rd Mechanized Infantry Battalion (503 M/K ΤΠ)
  - 616th Mechanized Infantry Battalion (616 M/K ΤΠ)
  - 105th Self Propelled Artillery Battalion (105 Μ Α/K ΠΒ)
  - 3rd Antitank Company (3 ΛΑΤ)
  - 3rd Engineer Company (3 ΛΜΧ)
  - 3rd Signal Company (3 ΛΔΒ)
  - 3rd Support Battalion (3 ΤΥΠ)
- 30th Mechanized Infantry Brigade "Tomoritsa", based at Lagos, Thrace
  - HQ Company (ΙΣΤ)
  - 16th Armored Battalion (16 ΕΜΑ)
  - 516th Mechanized Infantry Battalion (516 M/K ΤΠ)
  - 565th Mechanized Infantry Battalion (565 M/K ΤΠ)
  - 129th Self Propelled Artillery Battalion (129 Μ Α/K ΠΒ)
  - 30th Antitank Company (30 ΛΑΤ)
  - 30th Engineer Company (30 ΛΜΧ)
  - 30th Signal Company (30 ΛΔΒ)
  - 30th Support Battalion (30 ΤΥΠ)
- 21st Armoured Brigade, based at Komotini, Thrace
  - HQ Company (ΙΣ/ΧΧΙ ΤΘΤ)
  - 211 Medium Tank Battalion (211η ΕΜΑ)
  - 212 Medium Tank Battalion (212η ΕΜΑ)
  - 646th Mechanized Infantry Battalion (646ο M/K ΤΠ)
  - 140th Self Propelled Artillery Battalion (140η Μ Α/K ΠΒ)
  - 21st Engineer Company (21 ΛΜΧ)
  - 21st Signal Company (21 ΛΔΒ)
  - 21st Support Battalion (21 ΤΥΠ)
