= Sixteenth of the month =

Recurring ordinal calendar date

The sixteenth of the month or sixteenth day of the month is the recurring calendar date position corresponding to the day numbered 16 of each month. In the Gregorian calendar (and other calendars that number days sequentially within a month), this day occurs in every month of the year, and therefore occurs twelve times per year. In months with 30 days, the sixteenth is just after the middle of the month, while in months with 31 days, this day is the middle day of the month.

- Sixteenth of January
- Sixteenth of February
- Sixteenth of March
- Sixteenth of April
- Sixteenth of May
- Sixteenth of June
- Sixteenth of July
- Sixteenth of August
- Sixteenth of September
- Sixteenth of October
- Sixteenth of November
- Sixteenth of December

In addition to these dates, this date occurs in months of many other calendars, such as the Bengali calendar and the Hebrew calendar.

== See also ==
- Sixteenth (disambiguation)
