= Alexander Kovalevsky (general) =

Russian general

Alexander Semyonovich Kovalevsky
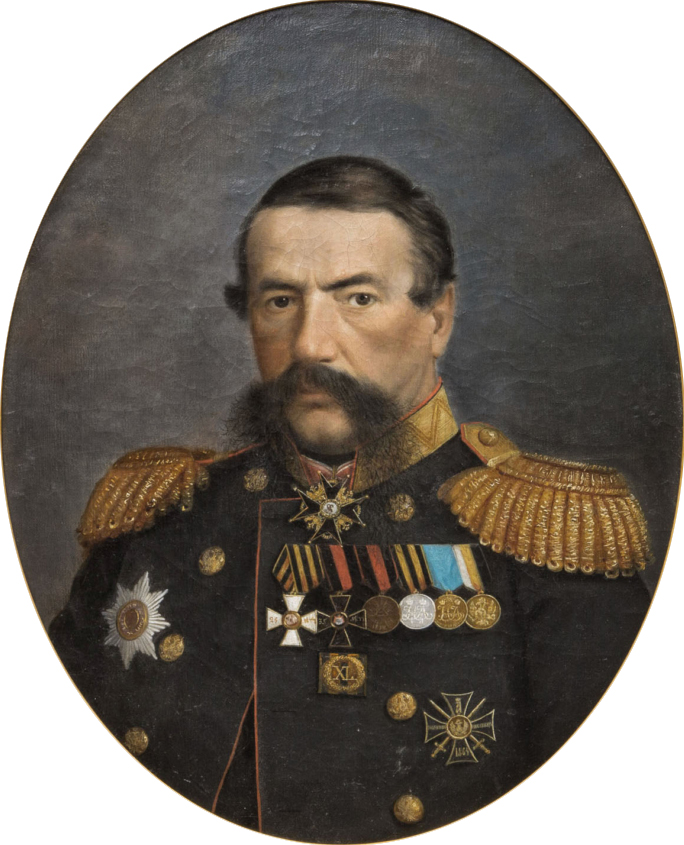
- Born: August 23, 1807
- Died: February 15/27, 1877; Chuguev, Russian Empire (today Chuhuiv, Ukraine)
- Military career
- Allegiance: Russian Empire
- Branch: Imperial Russian Army
- Rank: lieutenant general
- Commands: 26th Infantry Division (Russian Empire)
- Conflicts: November Uprising; Caucasian War; Crimean War

Alexander Semyonovich Kovalevsky (Russian: Александр Семёнович Ковалевский; August 23, 1807 – February 15/27, 1877) was Russian Lieutenant General, participant in the Caucasus campaigns and the Crimean War, military lawyer, chairman of the Kharkov Military District Court.

Born on August 23, 1807. Educated in the 3rd cadet corps, from which he was released on June 25, 1827 as an ensign in the cavalry artillery company No. 14. In 1831 he took part in the campaign against the rebellious Poles. Since 1844, being a captain, he commanded a light horse-drawn No. 18 battery. On February 18, 1852, promoted to Polkovnik, commanded a horse-artillery light No. 25 battery. From 1853 he served in the Caucasus and took part in campaigns against the mountaineers. On November 26, 1853, he was awarded the Order of St. George, 4th class (No. 9076 according to the Grigorovich-Stepanov knight list). In 1854–1855, in the ranks of the Caucasian army, he fought against the Turks in Transcaucasia. He commanded a lightweight cavalry artillery battery No. 10.

In 1858 he was enlisted in the field foot artillery and was appointed head of the Kharkov military settlements correcting the post. On February 11, 1860, he was promoted to major general with confirmation in his post, but in 1862 he was expelled. On August 15, 1863, he was given command of the 26th Infantry Division. On March 27, 1866, he was promoted to lieutenant general and on July 21 of the same year, he surrendered command of the division and was enlisted in field foot artillery. In 1868, he was appointed chairman of the Moscow Military District Court, but the next year he was transferred to a similar position in Kharkov.

He died in Chuguev on February 27, 1877 (according to other sources - on February 15).)

== Awards ==
Among other awards, Kovalevsky had orders:

- Order of St. Stanislaus 3rd degree (1842)
- Order of St. Stanislaus, 2nd degree (1847)
- Order of St. George, 4th class (1853, for the impeccable service of 25 years in the officer ranks)
- Order of Saint Anne 2nd class with the imperial crown (1859)
- Order of St. Stanislaus 1st degree (1862)
- Order of St. Vladimir, 4th degree with a bow (1863, for impeccable service of 35 years in the officer ranks)
- Order of St. Anne 1st degree (1864)
- Order of St. Vladimir, 2nd degree (1869)
- Order of the White Eagle (1871)
- Cross "For Service in the Caucasus"

== Bibliography ==
- Волков, Сергей Владимирович (2009). Генералитет Российской империи. Энциклопедический словарь генералов и адмиралов от Петра I до Николая II. Vol. I: А—К. Moscow: Центрполиграф.
- Ежегодник русской армии за 1878 год. Часть II. Saint Petersburg: в Военной типографии. 1878.
- Список генералам по старшинству. Исправлено по 1-е декабря. Saint Petersburg: в Военной типографии. 1876.
- Степанов, В. С.; Григорович, П. И. (1869). В память столетнего юбилея Императорского Военного ордена Святого Великомученика и Победоносца Георгия. (1769—1869). Saint Petersburg: в типографии В. Д. Скарятина.

Military offices
Preceded by	Commander of the 26th Infantry Division; 1863-1866	Succeeded by Viktor Danilovich Krenke
