= 26th Infantry Division (Russian Empire) =

- 26-я пехотная дивизия
- Active: 1914–1918
- Country: Russian Empire
- Branch: Russian Imperial Army
- Role: Infantry

The 26th Infantry Division (Russian: 26-я пехо́тная диви́зия, 26-ya Pekhotnaya Diviziya) was an infantry formation of the Russian Imperial Army.

== Organization ==
- 1st Brigade
  - 101st Infantry Regiment
  - 102nd Infantry Regiment
- 2nd Brigade
  - 103rd Infantry Regiment
  - 104th Infantry Regiment
- 26th Artillery Brigade

== Commanders ==
- August 15, 1863 - July 21, 1866 - Major General (from March 27, 1866, Lieutenant General) Alexander Semyonovich Kovalevsky
- July 21, 1866 - xx.xx, 1869 - Major General (from August 30, 1867, Lieutenant General) Viktor Danilovich Krenke
- 05/02, 1869 - xx.08, 1878 - Major General (from March 28, 1871, Lieutenant General) Baron Eduard Karlovich Dellingshausen
- хх.хх.1878 - March 14, 1879 - Lieutenant-General Andrey Davidovich Gorshkov
- 03/14/1879 - 01/20, 1888 - Major General (from 04/12/1881 Lieutenant General) Nikolai Nikolayevich Malakhov
- 01/20/1888 - 01/01, 1898 - Major General (from 08/30/1888 Lieutenant General) Prince Shcherbatov, Alexander Petrovich
- 10.01.1898 - 12.06, 1898 - Lieutenant General Maksimov, Ivan Ivanovich
- 06/20/1898 - 09/26, 1898 - Major General Razgonov, Konstantin Iosifovich
- 17.12.1898 - 10.07, 1899 - Lieutenant General von Raaben, Rudolf Samoilovich
- 07.26.1899 - 07.14, 1902 - Major General (from 06.12.1899 Lieutenant General) Capital, Konstantin Akimovich
- 07.22.1902 - 09.17.1903 - Lieutenant General Pototsky, Ivan Platonovich
- 09/27/1903 - 02/17/1907 - Lieutenant General Buturlin, Dmitry Sergeevich
- 02/17, 1907 - 10/29, 1907 - Major General (from April 22, 1907, Lieutenant General) Shchagin, Vasily Vasilievich
- 11/09, 1907 - August 23, 1913 - Lieutenant General Kaigorodov, Mikhail Nikiforovich
- September 24, 1913 - January 16, 1915 - Lieutenant General Poretsky, Alexander Nikolaevich
- January 16, 1915 - August 25, 1915 - Major General Tikhanovich, Pyotr Andreevich
- August 25, 1915 - 08/11, 1916 - Major General Fyodor Ogorodnikov
- 08/11, 1916 - 04/10, 1917 - Lieutenant General Baranov, Pyotr Mikhailovich
- 04/10, 1917 -? - Major General Klimovsky, Pavel Petrovich
- 09.1917 - 04.1918 - Colonel Vasily Shorin (elected)

== Chiefs of Staff ==
- August 30, 1863 - 10/13, 1867 - Lieutenant Colonel (from 07/22/1864 Colonel) Zverev, Nikolai Yakovlevich
- earlier 08.02, 1869 - 25.05, 1875 - lieutenant colonel (from 30.08.1869 colonel) Vodar, Vasily-Georgiy-Karl Karlovich
- 06/07/1875 - 05/30/1878 - Colonel Yunakov, Leonty Avksentyevich
- May 30, 1878 - January 25, 1883 - Colonel Karpov, Alexander Fedorovich
- January 25, 1883 - September 21, 1887 - Colonel Stog, Mikhail Demyanovich
- 2 October 1887 - xx.xx.1891 - Colonel Munk av Fulkila, Leonard Alekseevich
- 07/01/1891 - 09/25/1892 - Colonel Bertels, Ostap Andreevich
- 09.25.1892 - 10.16.1898 - Colonel Probenko, Porfiry Gerasimovich
- 11/25/1898 - 07/04/1902 - Colonel Batashev, Nikita Mikhailovich
- 08/02/1902 - 03/04/1904 - Colonel Popov, Ippolit Ivanovich
- 03/22/1904 - 08/01/1905 - Colonel Kiselevsky, Nikolai Mikhailovich
- 09.21.1905 - 05.10.1906 - Colonel Thalgren, Vladimir Pavlovich
- 05/10/1906 - 07/21/1910 - Colonel Vakhrushev, Mikhail Nikolaevich
- 08/02/1910 - 03/21/1911 - Colonel Panov, Philip Petrovich
- 04/08/1911 - 12/27/1914 - Colonel Rudnitsky, Nikolai Kvintilyanovich
- 01.16.1915 - 05.16.1915 - I. D. Colonel Menchukov, Evgeny Alexandrovich
- 06/14/1915 - 06/10/1916 - Lieutenant Colonel Dorofeev, Konstantin Konstantinovich
- 06/10/1916 - хх.хх.1917 - and. D. Lieutenant Colonel (from 15.08.1917 Colonel) Malevanov, Vladimir Lvovich

== Commanders of the 1st Brigade ==
- earlier 11/01/1873 - 08/30/1874 - Major General Dekonsky, Pyotr Kozmich
- 09/12/1874 - 10/01/1874 - Major General Kuzmin, Ilya Alexandrovich
- 10/01/1874 - 03/14/1879 - Major General Nikolai Nikolayevich Malakhov
- 03/14/1879 - 05/07/1892 - Major General Mrochkevich, Ignatiy Feliksovich
- 05/10/1892 - 07/26/1899 - Major General Capital, Konstantin Akimovich
- 09/06/1899 - 03/03/1900 - Major General Kesyakov, Konstantin Iskrovich
- 04/05/1900 - 12/21/1902 - Major General Stakhiev, Pyotr Alexandrovich
- 01/28/1903 - 05/10/1910 - Major General Kannabich, John-Philip-Wilhelm Alexandrovich
- 05/10/1910 - 07/19/1914 - Major General Iosefovich, Felix Dominikovich
- 07.26.1914 - 08.27.1914 - Major General Druzhinin, Konstantin Ivanovich

== Commanders of the 2nd Brigade ==
- earlier 11/01, 1873 - February 26, 1874 - Major General Grenkvist, Fyodor Ivanovich
- February 26, 1874 - February 27, 1875 - Major General Kutnevich, Boris Gerasimovich
- February 27, 1875 - March 22, 1875 - Major General Mushnikov, Alexander Egorovich
- March 22, 1875 - July 10, 1884 - Major General Bizyaev, Ivan Semyonovich
- July 20, 1884 - April 24, 1889 - Major General Syrotsynsky, Vladimir Mironovich
- April 24, 1889 - November 28, 1890 - Major General Stepanov, Konstantin Savelievich
- December 12, 1890 - 22 April 1892 - Major General Buturlin, Sergei Sergeevich
- May 4, 1892 - September 15, 1900 - Major General Gek, Andrey Konstantinovich
- October 10, 1900 - 30 January 1906 - Baron von Funk, Maximilian Wilhelmovich
- January 30, 1906 - December 13, 1908 - Major General Krause, Nikolai Fridrikhovich
- 01/08, 1909 - 11/09, 1913 - Major General Przhetslavsky, Nikolai Nikolaevich
- 11/09, 1913 - 11/10, 1914 - Major General Larionov, Yakov Mikhailovich

== Commanders of the 26th Artillery Brigade ==
- earlier January 1, 1867 - after 05.02, 1870 - Colonel Simanov, Dmitry Stepanovich
- earlier March 15, 1872 - xx.xx, 1876 - Colonel (from 08/30/1873 Major General) Shestakov, Georgy Fedorovich
- xx.xx.187x - 03/25, 1877 - Major General Kostogorov, Yakov Mikhailovich
- March 25, 1877 - xx.xx.187x - Colonel Lingen, Ferdinand Alexandrovich
- October 22, 1878 - 09/07, 1889 - Colonel (from 08/30/1879 Major General) Kobylinsky, Stepan Osipovich
- 09/07, 1889 - March 16, 1892 - Major General Tsilliacus, Vasily Vladimirovich
- March 16, 1892 - March 16, 1899 - Major General Bobrovsky, Vladimir Osipovich
- December 29, 1899 - November 13, 1903 - Colonel (from 04/09/1900 Major General) Velyamovich, Alexander Feliksovich
- 13 November 1903 - 13 August 1905 - Major General Aliyev, Eris Khan Sultan Girey
- 1906 - Colonel Zheltov, Mikhail Konstantinovich
- September 22, 1906 - July 25, 1910 - Colonel (from 05/31/1907 Major General) Romishevsky, Modest Vladislavovich
- July 25, 1910 - 08.07, 1913 - Major General Mamantov, Vladimir Petrovich
- August 30, 1913 - 11/09, 1913 - Major General Zaretsky, Georgy Karpovich
- 11/09, 1913 - October 22, 1915 - Major General Zaets, Nikolai Alekseevich
