= 16th Wing =

16th Wing may refer to:

- 16th Air Expeditionary Wing, a formation of the United States Air Force
- 16th Bombardment Wing (World War II), a formation of the United States Air Force
- 1st Special Operations Wing (16th Special Operations Wing), also formerly known as "16th Pursuit Group", is a formation of the United States Air Force

== See also ==
- 16th Army (disambiguation)
- 16th Group (disambiguation)
- 16th Division (disambiguation)
- 16th Brigade (disambiguation)
- 16th Regiment (disambiguation)
- 16th Squadron (disambiguation)
