= Kodam V/Brawijaya =

V Military Regional Command/Brawijaya
- Komando Daerah Militer V/Brawijaya; Kodam V/Brawijaya
- Coat of arms and patch worn by Kodam V/Brawijaya personnel.
- Active: 17 December 1948 – present
- Country: Indonesia
- Branch: Indonesian National Armed Forces Tentara Nasional Indonesia (Indonesian)
- Type: Indonesia Regional Military Command
- Part of: Indonesian Army
- Garrison/HQ: Surabaya, East Java
- Mottos: Bhirawa Anoraga ("gallant yet humble")
- Colors: Red, gold, black

Commanders
- Commander: Maj.Gen. Piek Budyakto

Kodam V/Brawijaya (V Military Regional Command/Brawijaya) (Indonesian: Komando Dhaérah Militer V/Brawijaya) is a military region command of the Indonesian Army, as the 5th (Roman numeral "V") Kodam, which oversees the entire East Java Province. It traces its history to the first formation of the East Java Division in 1948.

== History ==
Establishment of Indonesian Army East Java Division

Based on the Minister of Defence of the Republic of Indonesia decision numbered A/532/48, on 25 October 1948, three Infantry Divisions responsible for the province of East Java, which are 5th Division / Ronggolawe, 6th Division / Narotama and 7th Division / Suropati, were merged into the Indonesian Army East Java Division. The division's raising ceremony in the Kuwak field, Kediri, was presided by then Colonel Abdul Haris Nasution.

Establishment of 1st Division / Brawijaya

On 17 December 1951, coinciding with the 3rd anniversary of East Java Division, 1st Division / Brawijaya was founded, as replacement of East Java Division. Brawijaya is a dynasty of the Majapahit Kingdom, that has been successfully integrated into the archipelago and made Majapahit into a powerful kingdom. The prefix "Bra-" or "Bhre-" in the name "Brawijaya" means "Great" and is a title of honour given to a young prince named Wijaya, a founder of the Majapahit Kingdom. It is today marked as its Raising Day.

1st Division / Brawijaya become 5th Territorial Army / Brawijaya

As a result of Decision of the Chief of Staff of the Army numbered 2/KS/Instr/52, dated 5 January 1952, 1st Division / Brawijaya was changed into 5th Territorial Army / Brawijaya (TT V/Brawijaya), based on the division of the Indonesian military territory into 7 Territorial Army.

5th Territorial Army / Brawijaya become Kodam VIII / Brawijaya

Based on Army Chief of Staff decision numbered Kpts/952/10/1959, the 5th Territorial Army / Brawijaya was changed into Kodam VIII / Brawijaya based on the change in division of the Indonesian Military territory, from 7 Territorial Armies to 17 Military Regions.

Kodam VIII / Brawijaya become Kodam V / Brawijaya

Based on Army Chief of Staff decision numbered Kep/4/1985, dated 12 January 1985, Kodam VIII / Brawijaya was changed into Kodam V / Brawijaya, the name it has carried till the present. This change is due to a massive reorganisation of the Indonesian Army, on the principles of "A Small Effective Unit" policies of then Commander of the Armed Forces Leonardus Benjamin Moerdani, which led to the formation of 10 military regions on the basis of the 17 then active at that time.

== Territorial units ==
The Territorial Units in Kodam V/Brawijaya include four Military Area Commands (Korem):

1. Korem 081/Dhirotsaha Jaya with HQ in Madiun

- Kodim 0801/Pacitan
- Kodim 0802/Ponorogo
- Kodim 0803/Madiun
- Kodim 0804/Magetan
- Kodim 0805/Ngawi
- Kodim 0806/Trenggalek
- Kodim 0807/Tulungagung
- Kodim 0808/Blitar
- Kodim 0810/Nganjuk
- 511th Infantry Battalion/Dibyatara Yudha

2. Korem 082/Citra Panca Yudha Jaya with HQ in Mojokerto

- Kodim 0809/Kediri
- Kodim 0811/Tuban
- Kodim 0812/Lamongan
- Kodim 0813/Bojonegoro
- Kodim 0814/Jombang
- Kodim 0815/Mojokerto

3. Korem 083/Bhala Dika Jaya with HQ in Malang

- Kodim 0818/Malang Regency
- Kodim 0819/Pasuruan
- Kodim 0820/Probolinggo
- Kodim 0821/Lumajang
- Kodim 0822/Bondowoso
- Kodim 0823/Sintobondo
- Kodim 0824/Jember
- Kodim 0825/Banyuwangi
- Kodim 0833/Malang City
- 527th Infantry Battalion/Baladhika Jaya

4. Korem 084/Bhaskara Jaya with HQ in Surabaya

- Kodim 0816/Sidoarjo
- Kodim 0817/Gresik
- Kodim 0826/Pamekasan
- Kodim 0827/Sumenep
- Kodim 0828/Sampang
- Kodim 0829/Bangkalan
- Kodim 0830/North Surabaya
- Kodim 0831/East Surabaya
- Kodim 0832/South Surabaya

== Combat/combat-support units ==
The following are the combat or combat-support formations of this command:

- 16th Infantry Brigade (Mechanized)/Wira Yudha
  - Brigade HQ
  - 512nd Mechanized Infantry Battalion/Quratara Yudha
  - 516th Infantry Battalion/Caraka Yudha
  - 521st Infantry Battalion/Dadaha Yudha
- 500th Raider Infantry Battalion/Sikatan
- 8th Field Artillery Battalion/Uddata Yudha
- 8th Medium Air Defence Artillery Battalion/Marwaca Bhuana Cakti
- 5th Combat Engineers Battalion/Arati Bhaya Wighina
- 3rd Armoured Cavalry Battalion/Andhaka Cakti
- 3rd Assault Cavalry Troop/Tupai Setia Sakti

== Training units ==
The training units in Kodam V/Brawijaya are organised under the Kodam V/Brawijaya Training Regiment/Resimen Induk Kodam V/Brawijaya (Rindam V/Brawijaya); the units are:

- Regiment HQ
- Satuan Dodik Latpur (Combat Training Command Unit)
- Satuan Dodik Kejuruan (Specialist Training Command Unit)
- Sekolah Calon Bintara (Non-Commissioned Officer Training School)
- Sekolah Calon Tamtama (Enlisted Training School)
- Satuan Dodik Bela Negara (National Defence Training Command Unit)

== Support units ==
The other support units are:

- Military Police Command (Pomdam V/Brawijaya)
- Public Affairs and Media Unit (Pendam V/Brawijaya)
- Adjutant General's Office (Anjendam V/Brawijaya)
- Military Physical Fitness and Sports (Jasdam V/Brawijaya)
- Medical Department (Kesdam V/Brawijaya)
- Veterans and National Reserves Administration (Babiminvetcadam V/Brawijaya)
- Topography Service (Topdam V/Brawijaya)
- Chaplaincy Corps (Bintaldam V/Brawijaya)
- Finance Office (Kudam V/Brawijaya)
- Legal Affairs (Kumdam V/Brawijaya)
- HQ and HQ Services Detachment (Detasemen V/Brawijaya)
- Information and Communications Technology (Infolahtadam V/Brawijaya)
- Logistics and Transportation Corps (Bekangdam V/Brawijaya)
- Signals Corps (Hubdam V/Brawijaya)
- Ordnance Corps (Paldam V/Brawijaya)
- Engineers Command (Zidam V/Brawijaya)
- Cyber Operation Unit (Sandidam V/Brawijaya)
- Intelligence Command (Deninteldam V/Brawijaya)
