= 3rd Mechanized Infantry Brigade =

3rd Mechanized Infantry Brigade 'RIMINI"
- 3η Μηχανοκίνητη Ταξιαρχία 'ΡΙΜΙΝΙ"
- flag and emblem of the 3rd Mechanized Infantry Brigade 'RIMINI'
- Country: Greece
- Branch: Hellenic Army
- Type: Mechanized Infantry
- Size: Brigade
- Part of: 16th Mechanized Infantry Division
- Garrison/HQ: Kavyli, Orestiada
- Motto: Αναφαίρετον όπλον αρετή Anafereton oplon areti
- Engagements: World War I, Asia Minor Campaign, Greco-Italian War

The 3rd Mechanized Infantry Brigade "RIMINI" (3η Μηχανοκίνητη Ταξιαρχία «ΡΙΜΙΝΙ») is a mechanized infantry brigade of the Hellenic Army based at Kavyli, Orestiada.

== History ==
The brigade was established on 1885 at Trikala as a regiment and took part in the Allied intervention in the Russian Civil War in the aftermath of World War I. It also participated in the Asia Minor Campaign under the command of Nikolaos Plastiras.

The unit remains at Orestiada since 1977 as a regiment and after a Hellenic Army's wide re-organization became a brigade and took the honourable name 'Rimini', continuing the tradition of the 3rd Greek Mountain Brigade of World War II.

== Structure ==
- HQ Company (ΙΣΤ/3ης Μ/Κ ΤΑΞ ΠΖ) based at Kavyli.
- 311th Armored Battalion (311 ΕΜΑ) at Orestiada.
- 502nd Mechanized Infantry Battalion (502 M/K ΤΠ) at Kavyli.
- 503rd Mechanized Infantry Battalion (503 M/K ΤΠ) at Nea Vyssa.
- 508th Mechanized Infantry Battalion (508 M/Κ ΤΠ) at Rizia
- 616th Mechanized Infantry Battalion (616 M/K ΤΠ) at Lepti.
- 105th Self Propelled Artillery Battalion (105 Μ Α/K ΠΒ) at Kavyli.
- 3rd Antitank Company (3 ΛΑΤ)
- 3rd Engineer Company (3 ΛΜΧ)
- 3rd Signal Company (3 ΛΔΒ)
- 3rd Support Battalion (3 ΤΥΠ)
