= Eduard Karlovich Dellingshausen =

Eduard Karlovich Dellinghausen
- Born: 5 August 1824; Sellenkühl estate, Estland Governorate, Russian Empire
- Died: 14 November 1888 (aged 64); Tois estate, Estland Governorate, Russian Empire
- Allegiance: Russian Empire
- Service / branch: Imperial Russian Army
- Rank: general
- Commands: 26th Infantry Division; 3rd Army Corps; 14th Army Corps
- Battles / wars: Caucasian War; Crimean War; January Uprising; Russo-Turkish War

Baron Eduard Karlovich Dellinghausen (5 August 1824 - 14 November 1888) - baron, Russian general, participant in the Caucasian War and the Russo-Turkish War (1877–1878).

== Biography ==
Descended from the nobility of the Estland Governorate.

=== Marine service ===
He graduated from the course in the Naval Cadet Corps in December 1841 and was promoted to warrant officer with an appointment to the 25th naval crew, but then left to attend the course in the officer classes of the naval corps. At the end of the course until March 1846 he was in the carriage, and in March, due to illness, he was dismissed with the rank of lieutenant.

=== Army service ===
The naval service did not appeal to the young officer - and the same 1846, in September, finds him already an ensign of the Tenginsky infantry regiment with the appointment of an adjutant to the former chief of the main headquarters of the Caucasian army, Adjutant General Kotzebue.

=== Caucasian War ===
Already in January 1847 he took part in an expedition to the Galashevsky Gorge, in the detachment of Major General Nesterov. The same year was followed by the production of second lieutenant and then in lieutenant (June), for the difference in business during the actions in Dagestan of the main detachment of the Caucasian governor, Adjutant General Prince Vorontsov.

In 1848 he took part in the hostilities of the Dagestan detachment of the adjutant general of Prince Argutinsky and was awarded the Order of St. Anna 4th degree with the inscription "For Bravery" and St. Anna 3rd degree with a bow. The next year gave the opportunity to distinguish himself twice: when the village of Chokh was captured and when Shamil's troops were scattered; for these two cases he was promoted to staff captain.

In 1850, he took an active part in the construction of the Kurinsky fortification (in the detachment of Major General Kozlovsky), the camp and felling of wood on the Kachkalykovsky heights, for which he was promoted to captain.

In 1851, for new differences in business with the highlanders at p. Belaya, in the detachment of Lieutenant General Zavadovsky, received major epaulettes and was enlisted in the army. The next year passed quietly, but already in 1853 he found himself on the left flank of the Caucasian line and in the detachment of Lieutenant General Prince Baryatinsky participated in an expedition to the Galashevskoe gorge and in battles with Shamil.

For the distinction rendered in these matters, he is promoted to lieutenant colonel and, by order of the commander-in-chief of the Caucasian army, is attached to the Jaeger General-Field Marshal of the Prince of Warsaw Count Paskevich of the Erivan regiment.

=== Crimean War ===
The beginning of the Eastern War in 1853 found him adjutant to the chief of staff of the 4th and 5th corps on the Danube, Adjutant General P. Kotzebue, and for his activities during the siege of Silistria, he was awarded the Order of St. Vladimir of the 4th degree with a bow and a gold half-saber with the inscription "For Bravery".

In February 1855, he was appointed commander of the Orlovsky jaeger regiment of Count Paskevich of the Erivan regiment, but, not yet leaving for the place of new service, he was appointed commander of the then Vitebsk reserve jaeger regiment, which was being formed then, with production, on August 30, for distinction, to colonel.

=== Polish uprising of 1863 ===
From 1857 he commanded the Narva infantry regiment, and in 1863, for his distinction in suppressing the Polish rebellion, he was promoted to major general with the appointment to be at the disposal of the commander of the Warsaw Military District. Then, in 1864, he was assigned for special assignments at the headquarters of the Odessa Military District, and in 1867 he was at the 1st Guards Infantry Division and in February of the same year was appointed commander of the 11th Infantry Division, and then, in 1869 year, commander of the 26th Infantry Division. In 1871 he was promoted to lieutenant general.

=== Russian-Turkish War (1877-1878) ===
On the Russian-Turkish war of 1877–1878. went at the head of the 26th Infantry Division, which, after crossing the Danube, entered the detachment of the heir to the Tsarevich (the future Emperor Alexander III), where he successively commanded the Koprovitsky, Chairkioisky and Tarnovsky detachments, and successfully repelled the attacks of the Turks. Being the commander of the 11th Infantry Corps, located on the southern part of the vast front, occupied by the Ruschuk detachment of the heir to the crown prince, he had to take on the blow of Suleiman Pasha, aimed at Elena and Tarnovo. The lack of proper energy in the actions of the Turks and the persistent energy shown by them in collecting reinforcements helped the Russian troops to safely get out of an extremely difficult situation.

In January 1878, he commanded the left side detachment (12 battalions, 8 squadrons, 38 guns), which was to cross the Balkans at Tvarditsa, which was done without a fight, but with the greatest difficulties of movement along the icy mountain steeps. After crossing the Balkans and occupying Adrianople, he was appointed commander of the 9th Army Corps and Adrianople Governor General. For military distinction in 1877–1878, Dellingshausen was awarded the Order of the White Eagle with swords and gold, decorated with diamonds, sword with the inscription "For Bravery."

=== Resignation in the rank of general from infantry ===
In August 1878 he was appointed commander of the 3rd Army Corps, and in July 1882 - the commander of the 14th Army Corps.

In October 1885 he was promoted to general from infantry with dismissal from service.

He died in 1888 on his estate in Estland.

Military offices
Preceded by Viktor Danilovich Krenke	Commander of the 26th Infantry Division; 1869-1878	Succeeded by

== Sources ==
- Military encyclopedia / Ed. VF Novitsky and others - St. Petersburg: I. V. Sytin's t-in, 1911–1915.
- Russian biographical dictionary: In 25 volumes / under the supervision of A.A. Polovtsov. 1896–1918.
- Dellingshausen, Eduard Karlovich // Germans of Russia (encyclopedia) / Ed. College V. Karev. - M .: Publishing House "Public Academy of Sciences of Russian Germans", 1999. - T. 1: A — I. - S. 677 .-- ISBN 5-93227-002-0.
