= 16th Artillery Brigade (Ukraine) =

National Guard of Ukraine unit

16th Separate Artillery Brigade
- 16-та окрема артилерійська бригада
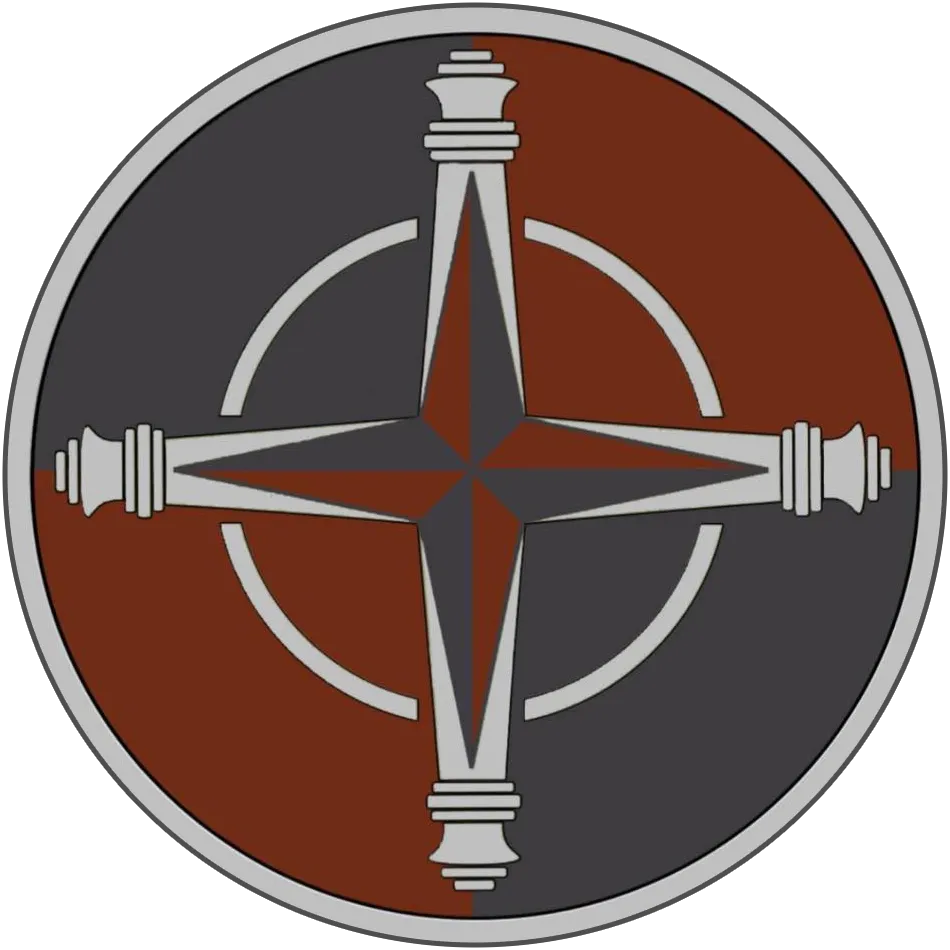
- Sleeve Patch
- Active: March 11, 2022 – present
- Country: Ukraine
- Branch: National Guard of Ukraine
- Role: Artillery Forces
- Garrison/HQ: Dnipro; MUN 3101
- Engagements: Russo-Ukrainian War
- Website: Facebook

Commanders
- Current commander: Colonel Oleh Holinei

The 16th Separate Artillery Brigade (Ukrainian: 16-та Окрема Артилерійська бригада) is a brigade of the Ukrainian National Guard formed in 2022. It is headquartered at Dnipro and is the sole artillery brigade of the National Guard of Ukraine.

== History ==
Brigade is a new national guard brigade formed in Dnipro. Brigade is assigned to the Northern Command of the National Guard in Kyiv and not the Central Command in Dnipro. It is the first artillery brigade formed in the structure of the National Guard. Brigade currently uses 2S22 Bohdana self-propelled howitzers after its replenishment as well as Tatra 815-7 mounted artillery pieces. It was formed by initiative of the commander of National Guard Oleksandr Pivnenko.

It was officially established on 11 March 2022, and immediately started combat operations. On 15 March 2022, near the village of Smolyaninove, the artillery brigade destroyed five trucks, ten vehicles, four fuel stations and two Russian BMPs. On 17 March 2022 near the village of Kudryashivka, the Brigade successfully destroyed another 20 Russian vehicles. On 18 March 2022, a command post, supply point, and ammunition depot of the Russian Army was destroyed by the brigade. On 17 June 2022, the brigade's commander, Goliney Oleh Vasyliovych, was awarded the Hero of Ukraine, the highest military award of Ukraine.

In early 2023, the personnel of the brigade were involved in anti-drone operations throughout Kyiv Oblast aimed against Shahed drones, in January 2023 these personnel were promised additional rewards for successful air defense operations but these additional payments were stopped in February 2023 due to budget constraints leading to an appeal by the brigade's personnel demanding the promised additional payments. A soldier of the brigade (Petrenko Ruslan Volodymyrovych) went missing in action on 3 May 2023.

In August 2024 Brigade was fighting along with Azov Brigade near Kreminna. President Volodymyr Zelenskyy presented Colonel Oleh Holinei with a battle flag during the awards ceremony on 24 August 2024.

== Structure ==
- Brigade HQ and HQ Battery
  - Target Acquisition Battery
  - Recon Battery
  - Observer Battery
  - 3x Field Artillery Battalions
  - Self-propelled Artillery Battalion
  - Anti-Tank Battalion
  - 1st Infantry Battalion
  - Security Battalion

== Commanders ==
- Colonel Viacheslav Syvka 2022–2023
- Colonel Oleh Holinei 2024–present
