= 16th Street Bridge =

16th Street Bridge may refer to:

- 16th Street Bridge (Pittsburgh) in Pennsylvania
- 16th Street Bridge in Sacramento, California along California State Route 160
- 16th Street Bridge (Washington, D.C.)
