= 16th Brigade =

16th Brigade may refer to:

== Australia ==
- 16th Brigade (Australia), an infantry brigade in the Australian Army
- 16th Aviation Brigade (Australia)

== British India ==
- 16th (Poona) Brigade

== Indonesia ==
- 16th Mechanized Infantry Brigade (Indonesia)

== Israel ==
- 16th Infantry Brigade (Israel)

== Poland ==
- 16th Independent Armoured Brigade

== Serbia ==
- 16th Krajina Motorized Brigade

== Soviet Union ==
- 16th Guards Spetsnaz Brigade
- 16th Tank Brigade (Soviet Union)

== Ukraine ==
- 16th Army Aviation Brigade (Ukraine)
- 16th Artillery Brigade (Ukraine)

== United Kingdom ==
- 16 Air Assault Brigade
- 16th Infantry Brigade (United Kingdom)
- 16th Mounted Brigade
- 16th Parachute Brigade (United Kingdom)
- 16th Reserve Brigade

=== Artillery brigades ===
- 16th Brigade Royal Field Artillery
- XVI Brigade, Royal Horse Artillery, formerly I Indian Brigade, Royal Horse Artillery

== United States ==
- 16th Combat Aviation Brigade (United States)
- 16th Engineer Brigade (United States), a combat engineer brigade of the United States Army National Guard of Ohio
- 16th Military Police Brigade (United States), a Military Police brigade of the United States Army headquartered at Fort Bragg, North Carolina
- 16th Sustainment Brigade

== Yugoslavia ==
- 16th Muslim Brigade (Yugoslav Partisans)

== See also ==
- 16th Army (disambiguation)
- 16th Wing (disambiguation)
- 16th Group (disambiguation)
- 16th Division (disambiguation)
- 16th Regiment (disambiguation)
- 16 Squadron (disambiguation)
