= Lagos, Evros =

Lagos Λαγός
- Settlement
- Location within Greece
- Coordinates: 41°27′N 26°28′E
- Country: Greece
- Administrative region: East Macedonia and Thrace
- Regional unit: Evros
- Municipality: Didymoteicho
- Municipal unit: Didymoteicho
- Community: Ellinochori

Population (2021)
  - Total: 451
- Time zone: UTC+2 (EET)
  - Summer (DST): UTC+3 (EEST)

Lagos (Greek: Λαγός) is a village in the northeastern part of the Evros regional unit in Greece. It is located south of Orestiada and north of Didymoteicho. Lagos is part of the community of Ellinochori within the municipality of Didymoteicho. In 2021 its population was 451. A military base next to Lagos is home to the Greek Army's 30th Mechanized Infantry Brigade.

== See also ==
- List of settlements in the Evros regional unit
