= Sixteen (card game) =

Card game published by Alpine Games

Sixteen is a card game for 2 or 4 players, designed for players 8 and older, and published by Alpine Games. According to Major Fun, the game includes a good balance of strategy and luck, it is easy to learn, and takes approximately 15 minutes to play.

== Rules and gameplay ==
The Sixteen game deck contains 54 custom cards of 4 different suits, numbered 0-6, with two wild cards. To begin, three cards are dealt to each player, and the remaining cards are then placed face down forming a shared draw pile. Players alternate playing cards onto a shared face-up play pile, which becomes the set that the players are trying to win. A set is formed when the sum of the cards in the play pile equals or exceeds 16. If the sum equals 16, then the player who played the final card wins the set. If the sum exceeds 16 (a bust), then the player who did not play the final card wins the set. A set is also formed when three consecutive cards of the same number or suit are played. Play continues until the draw pile is exhausted and all cards have been played. The player who wins the most sets wins the round.

== Awards ==
Sixteen has been recognized with the following awards:

- Major Fun Family Award
- TDmonthly Top Toy Award
- Dr. Toy Best Products Winner
- Creative Child Magazine Seal of Excellence
- NAPPA Honors
