= 16 =

Sixteen or 16 may refer to:

- 16 (number), the natural number following 15 and preceding 17
- one of the years 16 BC, AD 16, 1916, 2016

== Films ==
- Pathinaaru or Sixteen, a 2010 Tamil film
- Sixteen, 1943 Argentine film directed by Carlos Hugo Christensen
- Sixteen (1973 film), Italian film
- Sixteen (2013 Indian film)
- Sixteen (2013 British film)

== Music ==
- The Sixteen, an English choir
- 16 (band), a sludge metal band
- Sixteen (Polish band), a Polish band

=== Albums ===
- 16 (Robin album), a 2014 album by Robin
- 16 (Madhouse album), a 1987 album by Madhouse
- Sixteen (album), a 1983 album by Stacy Lattisaw
- Sixteen, a 2005 album by Shook Ones
- 16, a 2020 album by Wejdene

=== Songs ===
- "16" (Sneaky Sound System song), 2009
- "Sixteen" (Thomas Rhett song), 2017
- "Sixteen" (Ellie Goulding song), 2019
- "Six7een", by Hori7on, 2023
- "16", by Craig David from Following My Intuition, 2016
- "16", by Green Day from 39/Smooth, 1990
- "16", by Highly Suspect from MCID, 2019
- "Sixteen", by Buzzcocks from Another Music in a Different Kitchen, 1978
- "Sixteen", by Demon Hunter from Storm the Gates of Hell, 2007
- "Sixteen", by The Flaws from Achieving Vagueness, 2007
- "Sixteen", by Funeral for a Friend from The Young and Defenceless and Welcome Home Armageddon, 2010
- "Sixteen", by Iggy Pop from Lust for Life, 1977
- "Sixteen", by The Indelicates, 2007
- "Sixteen", by Le Tigre from This Island, 2004
- "Sixteen", by No Doubt from Tragic Kingdom, 1995
- "A Little Less Sixteen Candles, a Little More 'Touch Me'", by Fall Out Boy from the album From Under the Cork Tree, 2005
- "Christine Sixteen", by Kiss, 1977
- "Sixteen", by Ayesha Erotica from Big Juicy, 2016

== Places ==
- Sixteen, Kentucky, an American unincorporated community in Perry County
- Sixteen, Montana, an American unincorporated community in Meagher County

== Other uses ==
- 16 (magazine), a fan magazine marketed to adolescents
- 16 (TV series), a Chilean teen drama
- 6teen, a television series distributed by Teletoon
- Number 16 (spider), world's longest-lived spider
- Sixteen (card game), a card game published by Alpine Games
- "Sixteen" (Moesha), a 1996 episode of the comedy-drama series Moesha
- Sixteen (restaurant), on the 16th floor of Trump International Hotel and Tower, Chicago
- Sixteen (TV program), a 2015 South Korean music competition reality show
- Sweet Sixteen (birthday)
- Sulfur, a chemical element, atomic number 16
- 16 Psyche, a main-belt asteroid
- Rover 16, a mid-size car
- Renault 16, a hatchback
- Hillman 16, an executive car

== See also ==
- List of highways numbered 16
