= 16th Avenue =

16th Avenue or 16 Av may refer to:

- 16th Avenue, a street forming the Music Row district of Nashville, Tennessee
- "16th Avenue" (song), a 1982 song by Lacy J. Dalton
- 16 Avenue N, in Calgary, Alberta, Canada
- 16th Avenue (York Region), Ontario, Canada
- 16th Avenue Records, a defunct record label
- 16 Av, the sixteenth day of Av, the fifth month of the Hebrew calendar
