= 16th Kentucky Cavalry Regiment =

- Active: September 1863 - October 15, 1864
- Country: United States
- Allegiance: Union
- Branch: Cavalry

The 16th Kentucky Cavalry Regiment was a cavalry regiment that served in the Union Army during the American Civil War.

== Service ==
The 16th Kentucky Cavalry Regiment was organized at Paducah, Kentucky and mustered in for three years. It mustered in under the command of Major George F. Barnes.

The regiment was attached to 2nd Brigade, 2nd Division, Cavalry Corps, Department of the Ohio, to May 1864. 1st Cavalry Brigade, District of Kentucky, 5th Division, XXIII Corps, Department of the Ohio, to October 1864.

The 16th Kentucky Cavalry ceased when it was consolidated into the 12th Kentucky Cavalry on October 15, 1864.

== Detailed service ==
Duty at Paducah, Kentucky, until April 1864. Fort Anderson, Paducah, March 25–26, 1864. Ordered to Louisville, Kentucky, April 12. Operations against Morgan May 31-June 30. Cynthiana June 12. At Nicholasville, Kentucky, June to August. Cleveland, Tennessee, August 17. Gillem's Expedition from eastern Tennessee toward southwestern Virginia September 20-October 17. Leesburg September 28. Near Rheatown, Duvall's Ford, Watauga River, September 30.

== Casualties ==
The regiment lost a total of 58 men during service; 3 enlisted men killed or mortally wounded, 1 officer and 54 enlisted men died of disease.

== Commanders ==
- Major George F. Barnes

== See also ==
- List of Kentucky Civil War Units
- Kentucky in the Civil War
