= Sixteenth Amendment =

Sixteenth Amendment can refer to:

- Sixteenth Amendment to the United States Constitution
- Sixteenth Amendment of the Constitution of India, also known as the Anti-Secession Amendment, 1963 amendment enabling the government to restrict certain freedoms, followed the Sino-Indian War of 1962
- Sixteenth Amendment of the Constitution of Ireland
- Sixteenth Amendment to the Constitution of Pakistan
- Sixteenth Amendment of the Constitution of South Africa
