= 16 Squadron =

16 Squadron or 16th Squadron may refer to:

- No. 16 Squadron IAF, a unit of the Indian Air Force
- No. 16 Squadron (Finland), a unit of the Finnish Air Force
- No. 16 Squadron RAF, a unit of the United Kingdom Royal Air Force
- No. 16 Squadron RAF Regiment, a field unit of the United Kingdom Royal Air Force
- No. 16 Squadron RNZAF, a unit of the Royal New Zealand Air Force
- No. 16 Squadron RSAF, a unit of the Royal Jordanian Air Force
- No. 16 Squadron PAF, a fighter squadron of the Pakistan Air Force
- 16 Squadron SAAF, a unit of the South African Air Force
- 16 Tank Transporter Squadron (United Kingdom), a unit of the British Army
- 16th Aero Squadron, a unit of the United States Army Air Service
- 16th Air Squadron, a unit of the Indonesian Air Force
- 16th Airlift Squadron, a unit of the United States Air Force
- 16th Air Support Operations Squadron, a unit of the United States Air Force
- 16th Attack Squadron, a unit of the Philippine Air Force
- 16th Electromagnetic Warfare Squadron, a unit of the United States Space Force
- 16th Electronic Warfare Squadron, a unit of the United States Air Force
- 16th Reconnaissance Squadron of Anti-Aircraft Artillery, a unit of the Yugoslav Air Force
- 16th Special Operations Squadron, a unit of the United States Air Force
- 16th Weapons Squadron, a unit of the United States Air Force
- Marine Aviation Logistics Squadron 16, a unit of the United States Marine Corps
- Submarine Squadron 16, a unit of the United States Navy
- VP-16 (Patrol Squadron 16), a unit of the United States Navy
- VPB-16 (Patrol Bombing Squadron 16), a unit of the United States Navy

== See also ==
- No. 16 Air Observation Post Flight RAAF, a unit of the Royal Australian Air Force
- 16th Army (disambiguation)
- 16th Wing (disambiguation)
- 16th Group (disambiguation)
- 16th Division (disambiguation)
- 16th Brigade (disambiguation)
- 16th Regiment (disambiguation)
