= 16th Air Support Operations Squadron =

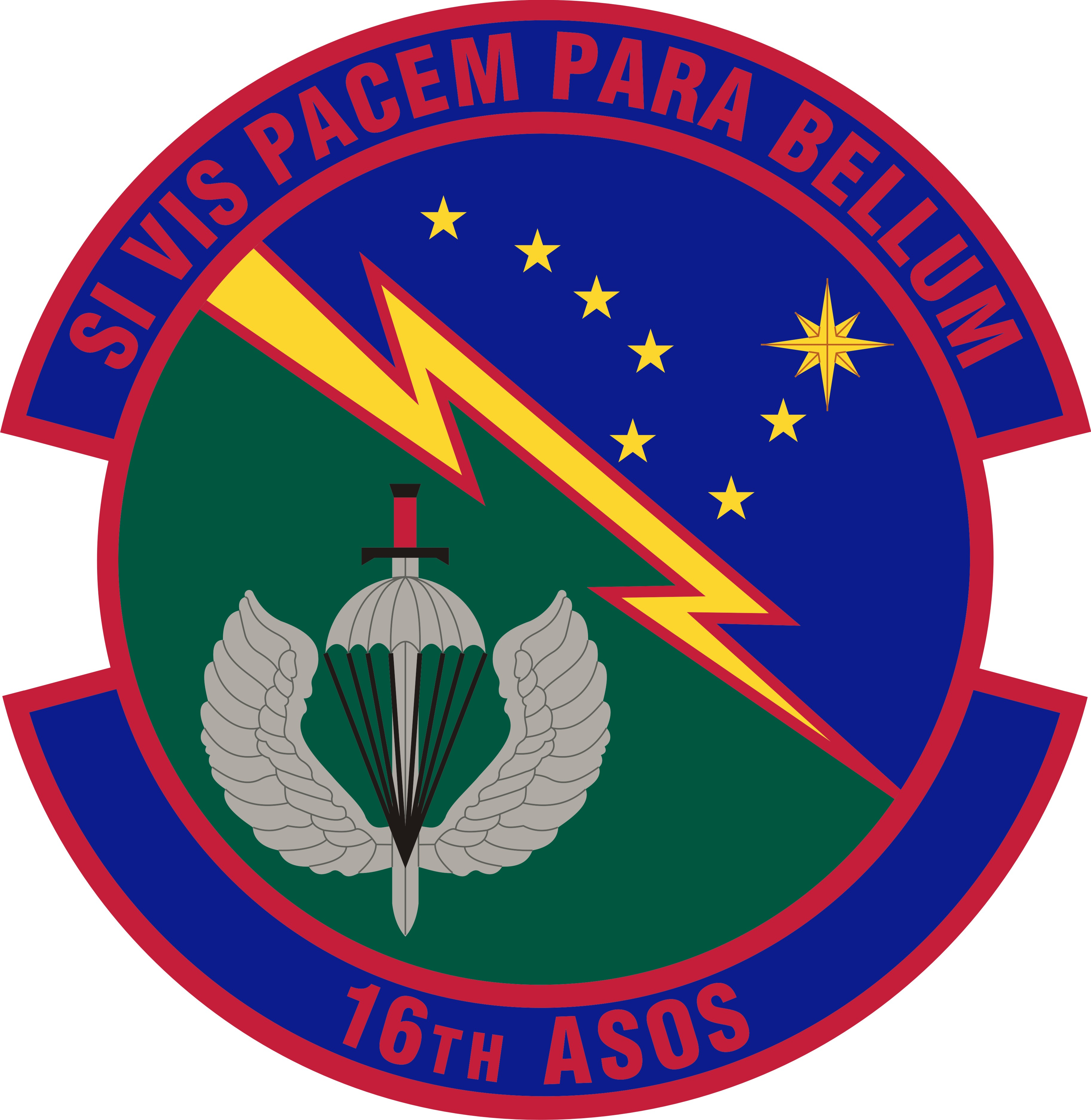
- 16th Air Support Operations Squadron emblem
- Active: 1994–95; 2008–10
- Country: United States
- Branch: United States Air Force
- Type: Combat Support
- Role: Air Support Operations
- Part of: PACAF/13th Air Force
- Garrison/HQ: Fort Richardson, Alaska
- Decorations: AFOUA

The 16th Air Support Operations Squadron (16 ASOS) was a combat support unit of the United States Air Force, located at Joint Base Elmendorf-Richardson in Anchorage, Alaska. Inactivated 2010 and replaced by the 3d Air Support Operations Squadron at the same location.

== Lineage ==
Constituted as 16 Air Support Communications Squadron on 24 Mar 1943. Activated on 15 Apr 1943. Redesignated 16 Tactical Air Communications Squadron on 29 Feb 1944. Disbanded on 20 Apr 1944. Reconstituted and redesignated 16 Air Support Operations Squadron on 24 Jun 1994. Activated on 1 Jul 1994. Inactivated on 1 Jun 1995. Activated on 15 May 2008. Inactivated 13 Sep 2010.

== Assignments ==
Third Air Force, 15 Apr 1943; II Tactical Air Division, 18 Apr 1944-20 Apr 1944. 18 Air Support Operations Group, 1 Jul 1994-1 Jun 1995. 354 Operations Group, 15 May 2008; 13th Air Force, -13 Sep 2010.

== Stations ==
Esler Field, LA, 15 Apr 1943; Alamo Field, TX, 6 Jul 1943; Esler Field, LA, 28 Nov 1943; DeRidder AAB, LA, 18 Feb-20 Apr 1944. Fort Knox, KY, 1 Jul 1994-1 Jun 1995. Fort Richardson, AK, 15 May 2008-13 Sep 2010.
