= 16th Mechanized Infantry Brigade =

- Brigade Infanteri Mekanis 16/Wira Yudha
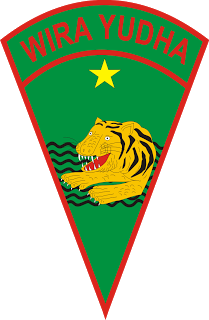
- Logo of the 16th Mechanized Infantry Brigade
- Founded: 20 November 1963; Reactivated: 12 April 2007
- Branch: Indonesian Army
- Part of: Kodam Brawijaya
- Garrison/HQ: Kediri, East Java
- Website: brigif16wirayudha.com

The 16th Mechanized Infantry Brigade (Indonesian: Brigade Infanteri Mekanis 16/Wira Yudha; abbr. Brigif M16/WY) is a mechanized infantry brigade of the Indonesian Army under the Brawijaya Military Command. It traces its roots to a regiment founded in 1946 during the Indonesian National Revolution, and it was upgraded to a brigade in 1963. It was deactivated in 1984, but was reactivated in 2007.

== History ==
The unit traces its origin to the 34th Regiment, founded on 1 January 1946 during the Indonesian National Revolution. The regiment was redesignated as a brigade on 22 July 1947, and after it took part in actions against the Indonesian Communist Party of 1948 it was placed under the command of the Brawijaya Division. It was again redesignated as the 52nd Regiment in 1952, and then into the 16th Infantry Brigade on 20 November 1963.

On 30 October 1984, the brigade was liquidated and its constituent battalions were absorbed into the Kodam's territorial commands. The brigade was reactivated on 12 April 2007, along with two other deactivated brigades and two newly formed brigades. On 3 May 2016, it was redesignated as a mechanized infantry brigade.

Its headquarters is located at Kediri City, East Java. The brigade's headquarters used to be a Japanese military base during the Japanese occupation of Indonesia which was seized by Indonesian youth led by PETA militia officer Machmud and local charismatic preacher Machrus Ali in 1945 shortly after Japan's surrender.

== Organization ==
The brigade has the following organization:

- 16th Mechanized Infantry Brigade
  - 512th Mechanized Infantry Battalion
  - 516th Mechanized Infantry Battalion
  - 521st Mechanized Infantry Battalion
  - Brigade HQ Detachment

They are equipped with Pindad Komodos and Anoa APCs, with small arms including Pindad-manufactured SS2 rifles, SM-2 and SM-5 machine guns, and SPR-2 sniper rifles.
