= Ellinochori, Evros =

Ellinochori Ελληνοχώρι
- Community
- Location within Greece
- Coordinates: 41°22′N 26°28′E
- Country: Greece
- Administrative region: East Macedonia and Thrace
- Regional unit: Evros
- Municipality: Didymoteicho
- Municipal unit: Didymoteicho

Population (2021)
  - Community: 1,060
- Time zone: UTC+2 (EET)
  - Summer (DST): UTC+3 (EEST)

Ellinochori (Greek: Ελληνοχώρι meaning Greek village; formerly Βουλγάρκιοϊ, Bulgarian: Булгаркьой or Балъ Булгаркьой, Turkish: Bulgarkoj or Balı-Bulgarköy, Bulgarian village) is a village in the northeastern part of the Evros regional unit in Greece. Ellinochori is part of the municipality of Didymoteicho. It is situated on the left bank of the river Erythropotamos, northwest of the centre of Didymoteicho. In 2021 its population was 1,060 for the community, including the villages Lagos and Thyrea.

== Population ==
Year	Population village	Population community
1981	1,435	-
1991	854	-
2001	756	2,372
2011	593	1,373
2021	506	1,060

== History ==
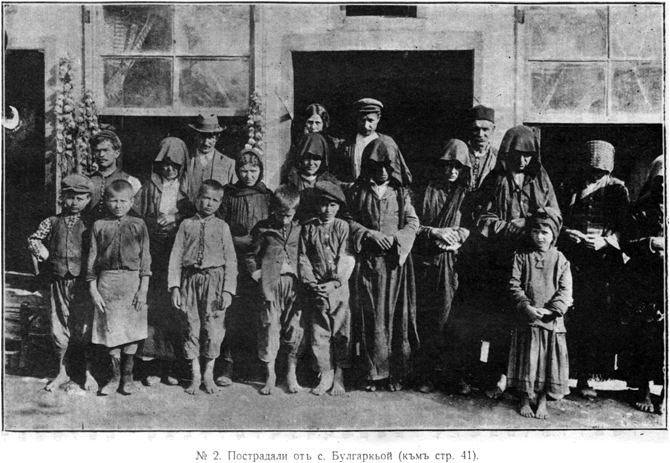
Bulgarian refugees from Bulgarkyoi (nowadays Ellinochori), expelled by the Ottoman forces, 1913.

The village was founded by the Ottoman Turks and named after its mostly Bulgarian population. It was ceded to Bulgaria in 1915 along with the rest of the lower Evros (Maritsa) valley, but following the 1919 Treaty of Neuilly it became part of Greece. As a result its Bulgarian and Turkish population was exchanged with Greek refugees, mainly from today's Turkey.

== People ==
- Michalos Garoudis (b. 1940)
- Panagiotis Goutzimisis (b. 1941)

== See also ==
- List of settlements in the Evros regional unit
