= 16th Street =

16th Street may refer to:

- 16th Street (Denver), a mostly pedestrianized street and transit mall in Denver, Colorado
- 16th Street (Manhattan), a street in New York City
  - 16th Street station (BMT Fifth Avenue Line), a former New York City subway station
- 16th Street Baptist Church, a church in Birmingham, Alabama
- 16th Street Park, a municipal park in Bayonne, New Jersey
- 16th Street station (Sacramento), a light rail station in Sacramento, California
- 16th Street station (Oakland), a former railroad station in Oakland, California
- 16th Street NW, a street in Washington, D.C.
  - Sixteenth Street Historic District, a historic district on 16th Street NW in Washington, D.C.
- 16th Street (San Francisco), a street in San Francisco, California
  - 16th Street Mission station, a Bay Area Rapid Transit station in San Francisco, California
  - Church and 16th Street station, a light rail station in San Francisco, California

== See also ==
- 16th Street Bridge (disambiguation)
