= 16th Cavalry Division (Russian Empire) =

- 16-я кавалерийская дивизия
- Active: 1914–1918
- Country: Russian Empire
- Branch: Russian Imperial Army
- Role: Cavalry
- Engagements: World War I; Great Retreat; Brusilov offensive

The 16th Cavalry Division (Russian: 16-я кавалерийская дивизия, 16-ya Kavaleriiskaya Diviziya) was a cavalry formation of the Russian Imperial Army, formed from the 2nd and 3rd Separate Cavalry Brigades.

== Organization ==
- 1st Cavalry Brigade
  - 17th Chernigov Hussar Regiment
  - 18th Nizhyn Hussar Regiment
- 2nd Cavalry Brigade
  - 16th Novoarkhangelsk Uhlan Regiment
  - 17th Novomirgorod Uhlan Regiment

== Commanders ==
- 02.12.1914 - 06.04.1915 - Lieutenant-General Abram Dragomirov
- 26.04.1915 - after 03.01.1917 - Lieutenant-General Nikolai Volodchenko
- 07.04.1917 — 27.08.1917 - Major-General Dmitry Gurko
- 27.08.1917 — 12.1917 - Major-General Alexander Onoprienko
