= 16th Air Expeditionary Wing =

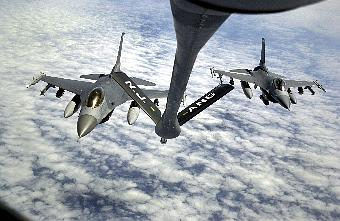
- Two F-16s from Aviano Air Base, Italy, after fueling from a KC-135 Stratotanker over the Adriatic Sea
- Active: 1997-2003
- Country: United States
- Branch: United States Air Force
- Role: Control of deployed expeditionary units
- Part of: United States Air Forces in Europe
- Motto(s): We Clear the Skies
- Engagements: Global War on Terrorism

Insignia
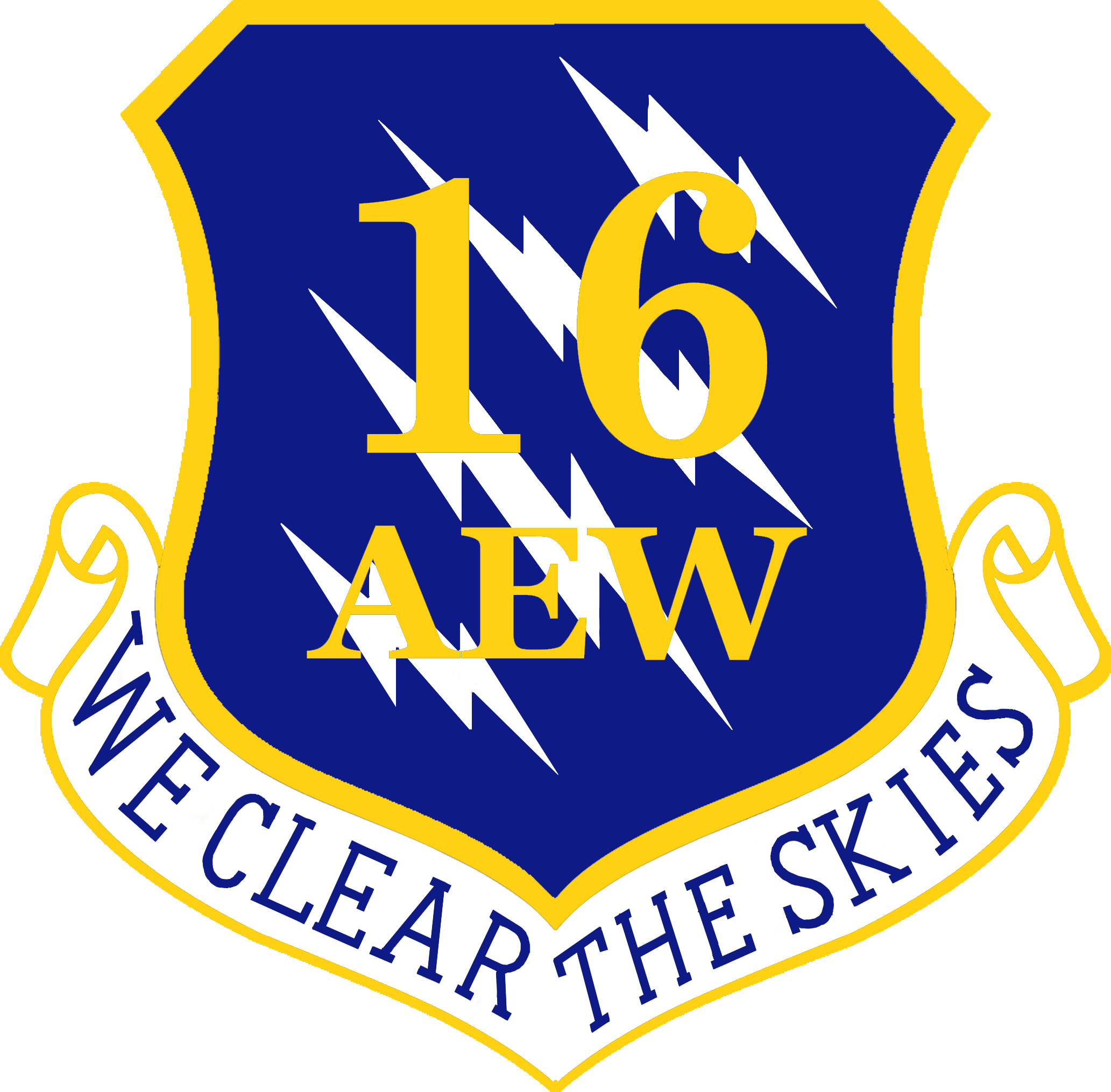
- Emblem used by the 16th Air Expeditionary Wing

The United States Air Force's 16th Air Expeditionary Wing (16 AEW) was a provisional Air Expeditionary unit of the United States Air Forces in Europe from 1997 for the purpose of supporting US no-fly zone and other operations in the Balkans. It remained active until June 2003, when it was replaced by the 401st Air Expeditionary Wing at Aviano.

== Units ==
The wing headquarters was located at Aviano Air Base, Italy. It operated from expeditionary sites at Camp Bondsteel, Kosovo; Camp Able Sentry, Macedonia; Sarajevo and Tuzla Air Base, Bosnia; Taszar Air Base, Hungary; Zagreb, Croatia and Naval Air Station Sigonella and San Vito Air Station, Italy; in addition to a contingency processing center at Rhein-Main Air Base, Germany.

== History ==
On 1 July 1995, United States Air Forces Europe activated the 7490th Wing (Provisional) at Aviano Air Base, Italy to control units deployed temporarily on the base in connection with Operation Deny Flight. The wing was replaced on 11 March 1996 by the 4190th Wing (Provisional) when the United States Air Force (USAF) began numbering provisional units based on the theater exercising operational control, rather than the Major Command to which they were assigned. The 4190th wing participated in Operation Deny Flight and Operation Joint Endeavour.

On 1 June 1997 the 16th Air Expeditionary Wing replaced the 4190th as USAF replaced its provisional units with expeditionary units. Its initial mission was as a component of Operation Allied Force, which was the North Atlantic Treaty Organization response to Serbian aggression against ethnic Albanians in Kosovo.

In June 2003 the 401st Air Expeditionary Wing was activated at Aviano Air Base, Italy, replacing the 16th Air Expeditionary Wing, which inactivated to eliminate an overlap in designation with the 16th Special Operations Wing at Hurlburt Field, Florida.

=== Lineage ===
- Designated as the 16th Air Expeditionary Wing, a provisional unit

Activated 1 June 1997
Inactivated 12 June 2003

=== Assignments ===
- United States Air Forces in Europe (attached to Sixteenth Air Force), 1 June 1997 – 12 June 2003

=== Components ===
- 16th Expeditionary Operations Group, Istres Air Base
- 401st Expeditionary Air Base Group, Tuzla Air Base
- 406th Expeditionary Air Base Group, Taszar Air Base
- 620th Expeditionary Air Base Group, Camp Able Sentry
- 2nd Expeditionary Air Support Operations Squadron, Camp Bondsteel
- 16th Expeditionary Air Support Operations Group, Sarajevo
- 16th Expeditionary Support Squadron, Rhein-Main Air Base
- 99th Expeditionary Reconnaissance Squadron, NAS Sigonella
- 775th Expeditionary Support Squadron, San Vito Air Station
- 525th Expeditionary Air Base Squadron, Zagreb

=== Stations ===
- Aviano Air Base, 1 June 1997 – 12 June 2003

== Weapons systems ==
- Boeing KC-135E/R Stratotanker
- General Atomics MQ-1A Predator UAV
- Lockheed U-2R
- General Dynamics F-16 Flying Falcon

== See also ==
- 401st Air Expeditionary Group - The unit's successor
