= Kavyli =

Kavyli Καβύλη
- Community
- Location within Greece
- Coordinates: 41°34′N 26°31′E
- Country: Greece
- Geographic region: Western Thrace
- Administrative region: East Macedonia and Thrace
- Regional unit: Evros
- Municipality: Orestiada
- Municipal unit: Vyssa

Population (2021)
  - Community: 523
- Time zone: UTC+2 (EET)
  - Summer (DST): UTC+3 (EEST)

Kavyli (Greek: Καβύλη) is a village in the northern part of the Evros regional unit in Greece. It is part of the municipal unit of Vyssa, which is part of the municipality Orestiada since 2011. It is bypassed by the Greek National Road 51 (Feres - Soufli - Orestiada - Ormenio). It is 7 km north of the centre of Orestiada, and 4 km southwest of Nea Vyssa.

== Population ==
| Year | Population |
|---|---|
| 1981 | 1,509 |
| 1991 | 1,337 |
| 2001 | 1,494 |
| 2011 | 758 |
| 2021 | 523 |

The town is populated by Arvanites.

== History ==
The village was founded by the Ottoman Turks, it was known as Emirler (Емирлер in Bulgarian). After a brief period of Bulgarian rule between 1913 and 1919, it became part of Greece. As a result, its Bulgarian and Turkish population was exchanged with Greek refugees, mainly from today's Turkey. Kavyli joined the municipality of Vyssa in the late 1990s.

== See also ==
- List of settlements in the Evros regional unit
