= 16th Battalion =

16th Battalion may refer to:

- 16th Antiaircraft Artillery Battalion
- 16th Battalion (Canadian Scottish), CEF
- 16th Battalion, Royal Western Australia Regiment
- 16th (Staffords) Parachute Battalion
- 16th Carnatic Battalion
- 16th Engineer Battalion (United States)

== See also ==
- 2/16th Battalion (Australia)
- Sixteenth (disambiguation)
