= 16th Garrison Division =

99th Division (1949-50) 16th Public Security Division (1950-57) 16th Garrison Brigade (1957-58) 16th Garrison Division (1959-64)
- Active: 1949.2 - 1964.11
- Country: (China)
- Type: Infantry, Garrison
- Size: Brigade
- Engagements: Chinese Civil War

The 99th Division (Chinese: 第99师) was formed in February 1949 from 2nd Regiment of 7th Division, 18th Regiment of 11th Division of PLA Bohai column of Huadong Field Army and defected Republic of China Army 538th Regiment of 180th Division. Under the command of 33rd Corps it took part in the Chinese Civil War. The division was then composed of:

- 295th Regiment;
- 296th Regiment;
- 297th Regiment.

After the Shanghai Campaign the division stationed in Baoshan, Shanghai. In November 1950 the division was re-organized and renamed as 16th Public Security Division(Chinese: 公安第16师) while detaching from the Corps. By then the division was composed of:

- 46th Public Security Regiment;
- 47th Public Security Regiment;
- 48th Public Security Regiment.

In February 1953 the division moved to Haimen, Zhejiang for coastal defense mission.

In July 1955 the division moved to Dachen Islands. 46th Public Security Regiment was detached.

In January 1957 the division was reduced to 16th Garrison Brigade(Chinese: 守备第16旅). 47th Public Security Regiment was detached. 48th Public Security Regiment was renamed as Dachen Islands Garrison Regiment. The brigade was composed of 48th Regiment and 4 artillery battalions.

In January 1958 the brigade was inactivated and became Taizhou Military Sub-district.

In January 1959 16th Garrison Division(Chinese: 守备第16师) was activated from the military sub-district. The division soon expanded to 3 garrison regiments (81st, 82nd and 83rd) and moved to Linhai, Zhejiang province.

In December 1964 the division was inactivated and became Taizhou Military Sub-district again.
