= 16th Regiment =

16th Regiment or 16th Infantry Regiment may refer to:

- 16th Air Defence Regiment, Royal Australian Artillery
- 16th Regiment "Belluno", a short lived light Infantry training regiment of the Italian Army, specializing in Mountain Combat
- 16th Punjab Regiment (Pakistan)
- 16th Infantry Regiment (South Korea)
- 16th Regiment Royal Artillery, a regiment of the Royal Artillery in the British Army
- 16th The Queen's Lancers, a cavalry regiment in the British Army, first raised in 1759
- 16th Infantry Regiment (United States), a regiment in the United States Army
- Bedfordshire and Hertfordshire Regiment, British Army regiment formerly designated the 16th Regiment of Foot

== United States ==
=== American Revolutionary War regiments ===
- 16th Massachusetts Regiment, a unit of the American Massachusetts Line

=== American Civil War regiments ===
- 16th Illinois Volunteer Infantry Regiment, nicknamed "The Twins", an infantry regiment that served in the Union Army during the American Civil War
- 16th Regiment Illinois Volunteer Cavalry, a cavalry regiment that served in the Union Army during the American Civil War
- 16th Maine Volunteer Infantry Regiment, an infantry regiment that served in the Union Army during the American Civil War
- 16th Michigan Volunteer Infantry Regiment, an infantry regiment that served in the Union Army during the American Civil War
- 16th West Virginia Volunteer Infantry Regiment, an infantry regiment
- 16th Wisconsin Volunteer Infantry Regiment, an infantry regiment that served in the Union Army during the American Civil War

== See also ==
- 16th Army (disambiguation)
- 16th Wing (disambiguation)
- 16th Group (disambiguation)
- 16th Division (disambiguation)
- 16th Brigade (disambiguation)
- 16th Squadron (disambiguation)
