= Formations of the Hellenic Army =

Greek military formations

Hellenic Army is commanded by the Hellenic Army General Staff which supervises five major formations. These are:

== First Army ==
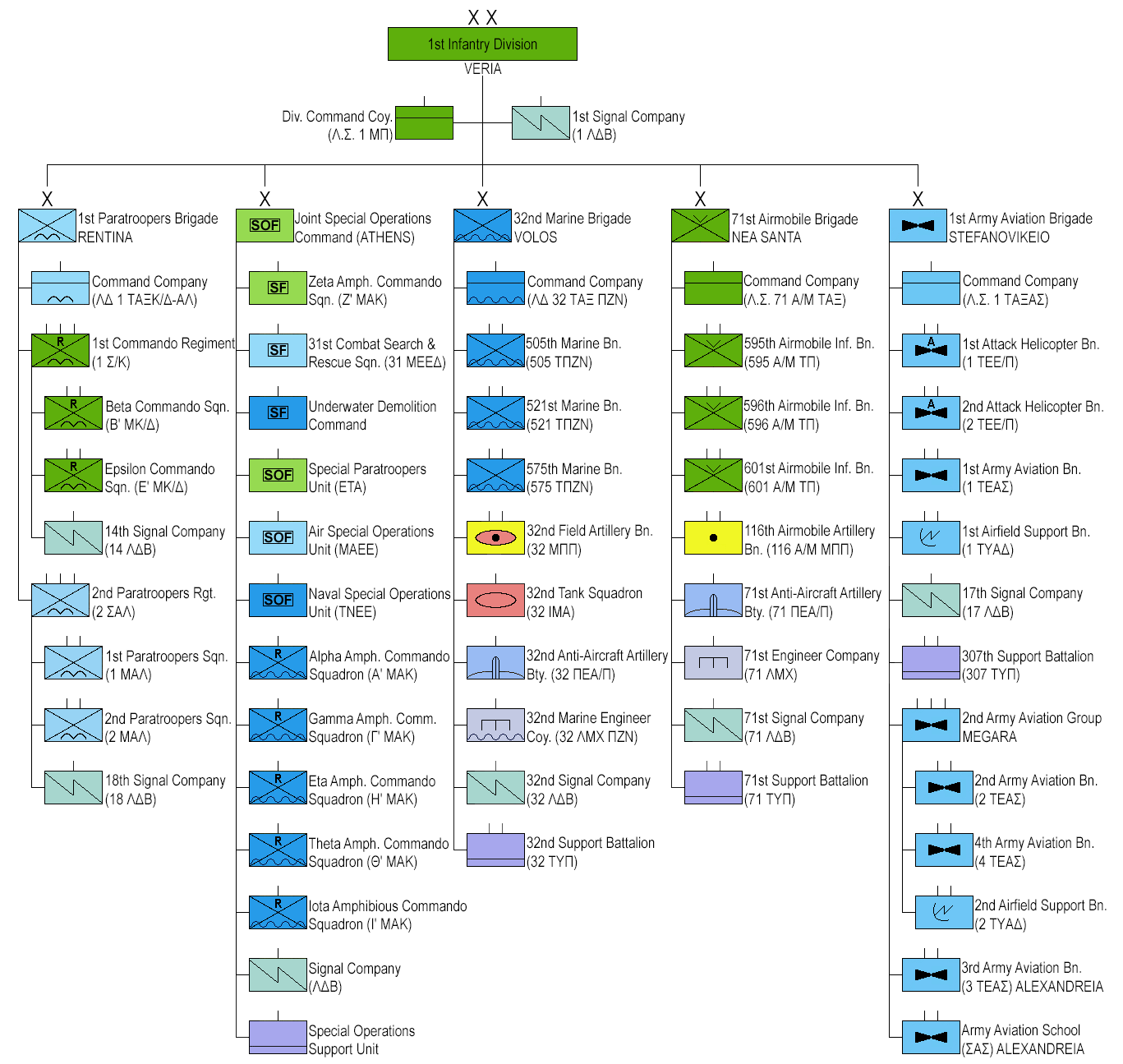
I Infantry Division Structure (click to enlarge)

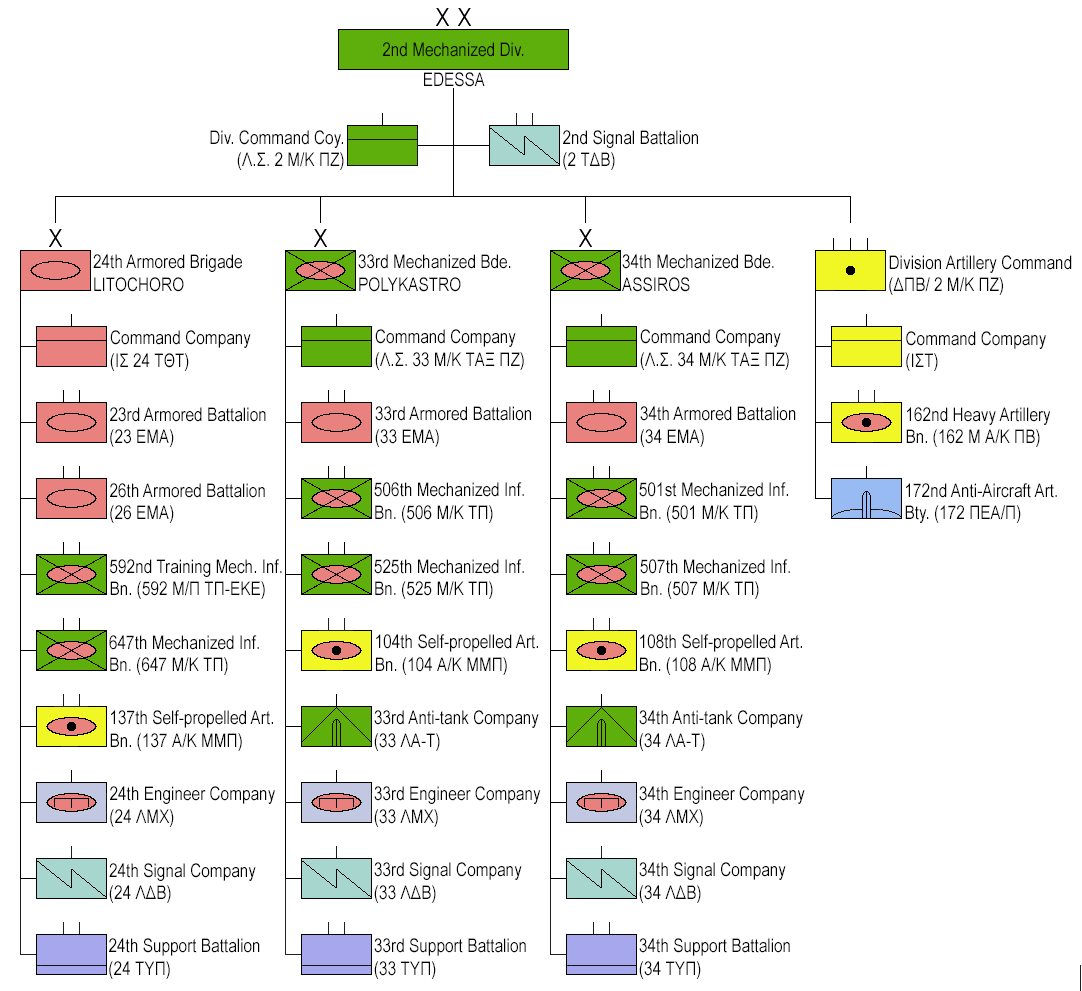
II Mechanised Infantry Division (click to enlarge)

- First Army (1η Στρατιά), headquartered at Larisa, Thessaly which includes
  - 1st Armored Cavalry Battalion
  - 730th Engineer Battalion
  - 476th Signal Battalion
  - 485th Signal Battalion
  - 488th Signal Battalion
  - 489th Signal Battalion
  - First Army Air Defense Artillery Command
    - 181st Medium Range Air Defense Battalion
    - 182nd Short Range Air Defense Battalion
  - I Infantry Division(I ΜΠ), based at Veroia, Macedonia
    - 1st Raider/Paratrooper Brigade
    - 32nd Marines Brigade
    - 71st Airmobile Infantry Brigade
    - 1st Army Aviation Brigade
  - II Mechanised Infantry Division (II Μ/Κ ΜΠ), based at Edessa, Macedonia
    - 24th Armored Brigade
    - 33rd Mechanized Infantry Brigade
    - 34th Mechanized Infantry Brigade

=== IV Army Corps ===
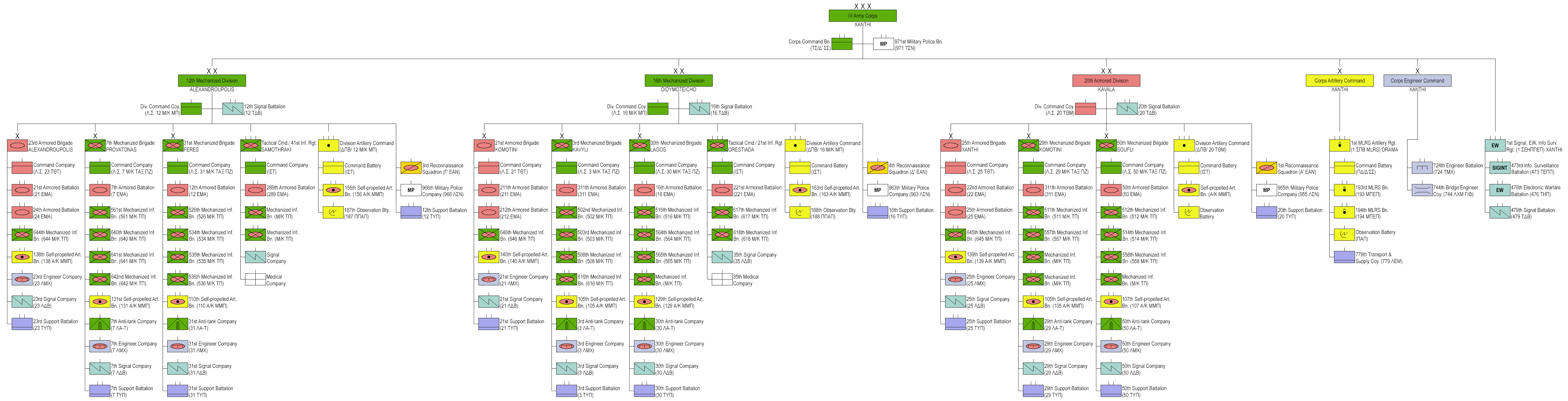
IV Corps Structure

- IV Army Corps (Δ' Σώμα Στρατού), headquartered at Xanthi, Thrace comprising the following units:
  - Corps HQ Battalion
  - 971st Military Police Battalion
  - 1st Communications, EW, Surveillance Regiment
    - 473rd Surveillance Battalion
    - 476th EW Battalion
    - 479th Signal Battalion
  - Corps Engineer Command
  - Corps Field and Air Defense Artillery Command
    - 1st Artillery Regiment-MLRS
      - 1st AR Headquarters Company
      - 36th Signal Company
      - 193rd Multiple Rocket Launcher Battalion
      - 194th Multiple Rocket Launcher Battalion
      - Observation Battery
    - 171st Short Range Air Defense Battalion
    - 173rd Short Range Air Defense Battalion
    - 174th Short Range Air Defense Battalion
    - 199th Self Propelled Heavy Artillery Battalion
  - XII Mechanized Infantry Division (XII Μ/Κ ΜΠ), based at Alexandroupoli, Thrace
  - XVI Mechanized Infantry Division (XVI Μ/Κ ΜΠ), based at Didymoteicho, Thrace
  - 20th Armored Division (XX ΤΘΜ), based at Kavala, Macedonia
  - 50th Mechanized Infantry Brigade "Apsos"
  - 29th Mechanized Brigade "Pogradets"

== III Army Corps ==
III Army Corps (Γ' Σώμα Στρατού) doubles as a NATO Deployable Corps:

- III Army Corps, based at Thessaloniki, Macedonia
  - 1st Infantry Regiment
  - 8th Infantry Brigade
  - 9th Infantry Brigade
  - 10th Infantry Regiment
  - 15th Infantry Regiment
  - 3rd Signals Brigade

== ASDEN ==
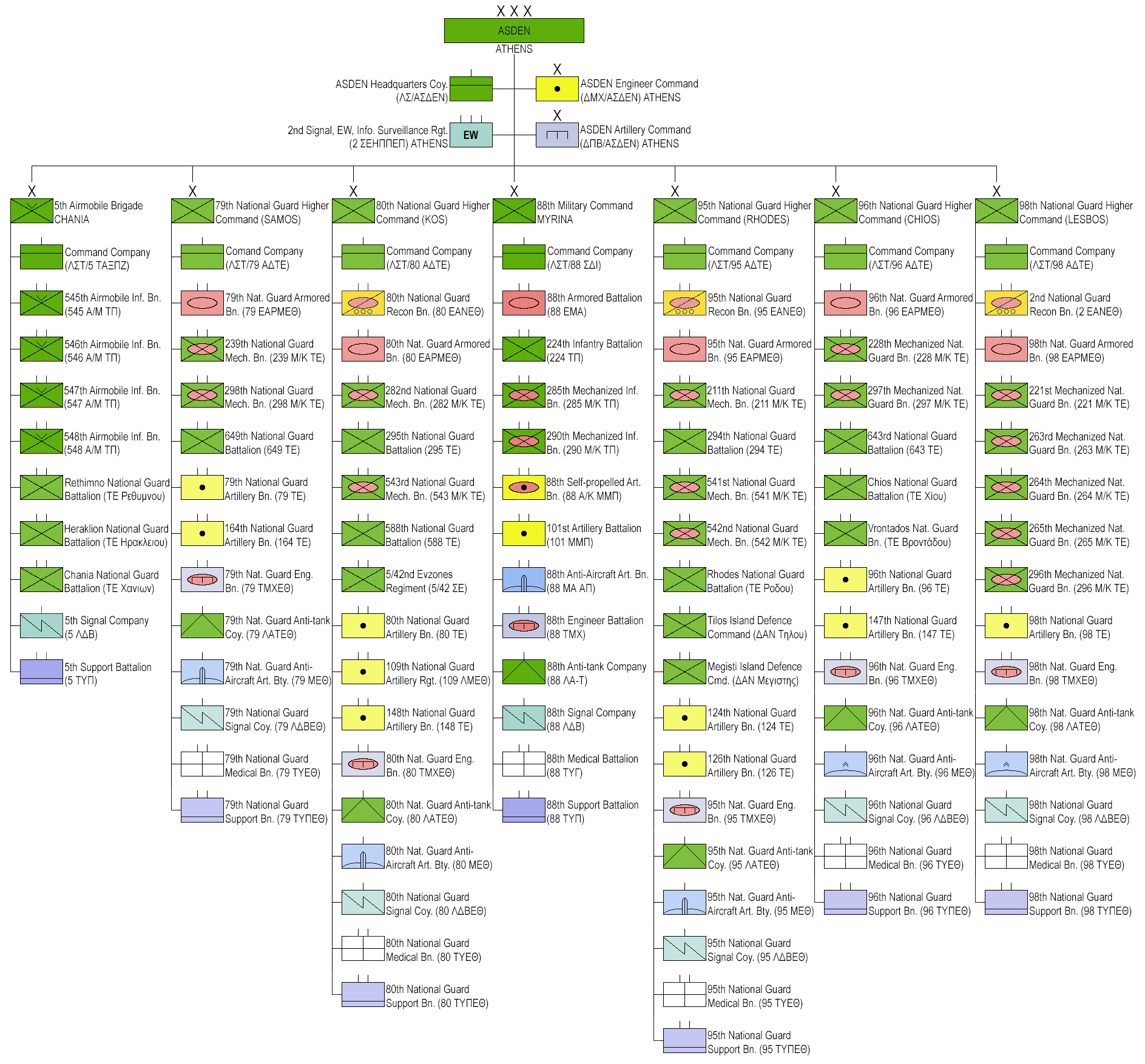
Supreme Military Command of the Interior & Islands Structure (click to enlarge)

- Supreme Military Command of Interior and Islands (ΑΣΔΕΝ), based at Athens, Attica
  - 5th Airmobile Brigade (5η Α/Μ ΤΑΞ), based at Chania, Crete
  - 79th National Guard Higher Command (79 ΑΔΤΕ), based at Samos
  - 80th National Guard Higher Command (80 ΑΔΤΕ), based at Kos, Dodecanese
  - 88th Military Command (88 ΣΔΙ), based at Myrina, Lemnos
  - 95th National Guard Higher Command (95 ΑΔΤΕ), based at Rhodes, Dodecanese
  - 96th National Guard Higher Command (96 ΑΔΤΕ), based at Chios
  - 98th National Guard Higher Command (98 ΑΔΤΕ), based at Lesbos

== Supreme Military Support Command ==
- Supreme Military Support Command (ΑΣΔΥΣ), based at Athens, Attica that includes
  - Supply Center Southern Greece, (ΚΕΦΝΕ), based at Athens, Attica
  - Supply Center Northern Greece, (ΚΕΦΒΕ), based at Thessaloniki, Macedonia
    - 4th Support Brigade (4η ΤΑΞΥΠ), based at Xanthi, Thrace
  - 651 Army Material Depot (651 ΑΒΥΠ), based at Agios Stefanos, Attica
  - Military Factories Command (ΔΙΣΕ), based at Athens, Attica divided in
    - 301st Base Factory (301 ΕΒ), based at Agioi Anargyroi, Attica
    - 303rd Base Factory (303 ΠΕΒ), based at Larissa, Thessaly
    - 304rd Base Factory (304 ΠΕΒ), based at Velestino, Thessaly
    - 308rd Base Factory (308 ΠΕΒ), based at Thessaloniki, Macedonia
- Doctrine, Training and Inspection Command (ΔΙΔΟΕ), based at Athens, Attica

== See also ==
- Hellenic Army
