= 96th National Guard Higher Command (Greece) =

- 96η Ανώτερη Διοίκηση Ταγμάτων Εθνοφυλακής, 96η ΑΔΤΕ
- Camp flag of the 96th National Guard Higher Command
- Country: Greece
- Branch: Hellenic Army
- Type: Mechanised Infantry
- Size: Brigade
- Part of: Supreme Military Command of Interior and Islands
- Garrison/HQ: Chios, Aegean Islands
- Motto(s): Καί ἰερά τά πάτρια τιμήσω I will honour the sanctuary of my fathers

The 96th National Guard Higher Command (Greek: 96η Ανώτερη Διοίκηση Ταγμάτων Εθνοφυλακής, 96η ΑΔΤΕ, 96 Anoteri Dioikisi Tagmaton Ethnofylakis, 96 ADTE), is a Hellenic Army mechanized infantry brigade responsible for the defence of the island of Chios, Greece.

== Structure ==
- 96th National Guard Higher Command (96η ΑΔΤΕ), based at Chios
  - HQ Company (ΛΣΤ/96 ΑΔΤΕ)
  - 96th National Guard Armored Battalion (96 ΕΑΡΜΕΘ)
  - 147th National Guard Battalion (147 ΤΕ)
  - 96th National Guard Battalion (96 ΤΕ)
  - 228th National Guard Mechanized Battalion (228 M/K ΤΕ)
  - 297th National Guard Mechanized Battalion (297 M/K ΤΕ)
  - 643rd National Guard Battalion (643 ΤΕ)
  - 96th National Guard Artillery Battalion (96 ΜΕΘ)
  - 96th National Guard Medical Battalion (96 ΤΥΕΘ)
  - 96th National Guard Engineer Battalion (96 ΤΜΧΕΘ)
  - 96th National Guard Anti Τank Company (96 ΛΑΤΕΘ)
  - 96th National Guard Signal Company (96 ΛΔΒΕΘ)
  - 96th National Guard Support Battalion (96 ΤΥΠΕΘ)
  - Chios Home Guard Battalion (ΤΕ Χίου)
  - Vrontados Home Guard Battalion (ΤΕ Βροντάδου)
