= 95th National Guard Higher Command (Greece) =

95th National Guard Higher Command "DIAGORIDON"
- 95η Ανώτερη Διοίκηση Ταγμάτων Εθνοφυλακής "ΔΙΑΓΟΡΙΔΩΝ" (95η ΑΔΤΕ)
- Camp flag of the 95th National Guard Higher Command
- Country: Greece
- Branch: Hellenic Army
- Type: Mechanized infantry
- Size: Division
- Part of: Supreme Military Command of Interior and Islands
- Garrison/HQ: Rhodes, Dodecanese
- Mottos: Φυλάξασθαι χρέος Do your duty

The 95th National Guard Higher Command (Greek: 95η Ανώτερη Διοίκηση Ταγμάτων Εθνοφυλακής, 95η ΑΔΤΕ), is a Hellenic Army mechanized infantry division responsible for the defence of the island of Rhodes in Dodecanese Islands.

In 2022 the unit was commanded by Major General Dimitrios Vakentis.

== Structure ==
- 95th National Guard Higher Command (95ή ΑΔΤΕ), based at Rhodes, Dodecanese
  - HQ Company (ΛΣΤ/95 ΑΔΤΕ)
  - 395th National Guard Armored Battalion (395 ΕΑΡΜΕΘ)
  - 95th National Guard Armored Reconnaissance Battalion (95 ΕΑΝΕΘ)
  - 211th National Guard Mechanized Battalion (211 M/K ΤΕ)
  - 541st National Guard Mechanized Battalion (542 M/K ΤΕ)
  - 542nd National Guard Mechanized Battalion (542 M/K ΤΕ)
  - 294th National Guard Battalion (294 ΤΕ)
  - 124th National Guard Artillery Battalion (124 ΜΠΒ)
  - 126th National Guard Artillery Battalion (126 ΜΠΒ)
  - 95th Anti Aircraft Artillery Battalion (95 ΜΕΑ/ΑΠ)
  - 95th National Guard Engineer Battalion (95 ΤΜΧΕΘ)
  - 474th National Guard Signal Battalion (474 ΤΔΒΕΘ)
  - 95th National Guard Anti Τank Company (95 ΛΑΤΕΘ)
  - 95th National Guard Supply Battalion (95 ΤΥΛΠΕΘ)
  - 95th National Guard Support Battalion (95 ΤΕΜΕΘ)
  - Island Defence Command of Tilos (ΔΑΝ Τηλου)
  - Island Defence Command of Megisti (ΔΑΝ Μεγιστης)
  - Rodos Home Guard Battalion (ΤΕ Ροδου)
  - Ano Kalamonas Home Guard Battalion (ΤΕ Ανω Καλαμωνα)
  - Κarpathos Home Guard Battalion (ΤΕ Καρπαθου)
