= 79th National Guard Higher Command (Greece) =

- 79η Ανωτέρα Διοίκηση Ταγμάτων Εθνοφυλακής, 79η ΑΔΤΕ
- Camp flag of the 79th National Guard Higher Command
- Active: 1964–present
- Country: Greece
- Branch: Hellenic Army
- Type: Mechanized
- Size: 5 Battalions
- Part of: Supreme Military Command of Interior and Islands
- Garrison/HQ: Samos, Aegean Islands
- Mottos: Θέλει αρετήν και τόλμην η ελευθερία Liberty demands virtue and boldness

The 79th National Guard Higher Command (Greek: 79η Ανωτέρα Διοίκηση Ταγμάτων Εθνοφυλακής, 79η ΑΔΤΕ) is a Hellenic Army mechanized infantry brigade responsible for the defense of the island of Samos.

The command's insignia depicts the island of Samos with a spear, rifle and helmet symbolising the military history of Greece. The Ionic column symbolises the ancient civilisation of Greece. It carries the names of Pythagoras, the ancient mathematician born on Samos, and Logothetis for Lykourgos Logothetis, who led Greeks on the island during the Greek War of Independence. The motto at the top of the insignia comes from the Ode to Samos by 19th century poet Andreas Kalvos and translates to "Freedom requires virtue and courage".

== Structure ==
- 79th National Guard Higher Command (79η ΑΔΤΕ), based at Samos
  - HQ Company (ΛΣΤ/79 ΑΔΤΕ)
  - 79th National Guard Armored Battalion (79 ΕΑΡΜΕΘ)
  - 649th National Guard Infantry Battalion (649 ΤΠ)
  - 239th National Guard Mechanized Battalion (239 M/K ΤΕ)
  - 298th National Guard Mechanized Battalion (298 M/K ΤΕ)
  - 164th National Guard Artillery Battalion (164 ΤΕ)
  - 79th National Guard Artillery Battalion (79 TE)
  - 79th National Guard Air Defense Battalion (79 ΜΕΘ)
  - 79th National Guard Engineer Battalion (79 ΤΜΧΕΘ)
  - 79th National Guard Medical Battalion (79 ΤΥΕΘ)
  - 79th National Guard Anti Τank Company (79 ΛΑΤΕΘ)
  - 79th National Guard Signal Company (79 ΛΔΒΕΘ)
  - 79th National Guard Support Battalion (79 ΤΥΠΕΘ)
  - Αgios Kyrikos Home Guard Battalion (TE Αγ Κυρηκου)
  - Samos Home Guard Battalion (ΤΕ Σαμου)
