= 80th National Guard Higher Command (Greece) =

- 80η Ανώτερη Διοίκηση Ταγμάτων Εθνοφυλακής
- Camp flag of the 80th National Guard Higher Command
- Country: Greece
- Branch: Hellenic Army
- Type: Mechanized
- Size: 5 Battalions
- Part of: Supreme Military Command of Interior and Islands
- Garrison/HQ: Kos, Dodecanese
- Mottos: Γαίαν και ύδωρ ου δίδομεν We will not give earth nor water

The 80th National Guard Higher Command (80ή ΑΔΤΕ) is a Hellenic Army mechanized infantry brigade based at Kos, in the Dodecanese Islands.

For a period the headquarters was based in Brunetti House on the Kos seafront. In the unit was commanded by Brigadier Spyridon Kogiannis.

== Structure ==
- 80th National Guard Higher Command (80ή ΑΔΤΕ), based at Kos
  - HQ Company (ΛΣΤ/80 ΑΔΤΕ)
  - 80th National Guard Armored Squadron Group (80 ΕΑΡΜΕΘ)
  - 80th National Guard Armored Reconnaissance Squadron Group (80 ΕΑΝΕΘ)
  - 282nd National Guard Battalion (282 M/ΚΤΕ) Mechanized
  - 543rd National Guard Battalion (543 Μ/ΚΤΕ) Mechanized
  - 295th National Guard Battalion (295 ΤΕ)
  - 588th National Guard Battalion (588 TE)
  - 80th National Guard Artillery Battalion (80 ΜΕΘ)
  - 80th National Guard Anti Aircraft Artillery Battalion (80 ΜΕΑΠ)
  - 80th National Guard Medical Battalion (80 ΤΥΕΘ)
  - 80th Anti Tank Company (80 ΛΑΤ)
  - 80th National Guard Anti Tank Company (80 ΛΑΤΕΘ)
  - 80th Engineer Company (80 ΛΜΧ)
  - 80th National Guard Signal Company (80 ΛΔΒΕΘ)
  - 80th National Guard Support Battalion (80 ΤΥΠΕΘ)
