= 88th Military Command (Greece) =

- 88η Στρατιωτική Διοίκηση
- Camp flag of the 88th Military Command
- Country: Greece
- Branch: Hellenic Army
- Type: Mechanized
- Size: 5 Battalions
- Part of: Supreme Military Command of Interior and Islands
- Garrison/HQ: Lemnos, Aegean Islands
- Mottos: Ποιείν α κελεύει πατρίς Do what your country commands

The 88th Military Command (Greek: 88η Στρατιωτική Διοίκηση, abbrev. 88 ΣΔΙ), is a Hellenic Army mechanized infantry brigade responsible for the defence of the island of Lemnos, Greece.

== Structure ==
- 88th Military Command (88 ΣΔΙ), based at Lemnos
  - HQ Company (ΛΣΤ/88 ΣΔΙ)
  - 88th Armored Battalion (88 ΕΜΑ)
  - 285th Mechanized Infantry Battalion (285 Μ/Κ ΤΠ)
  - 290th Mechanized Infantry Battalion (290 Μ/Κ ΤΠ)
  - 224th Infantry Battalion (224 ΤΠ)
  - 88th Self Propelled Artillery Battalion (88 Α/Κ ΜΒΠ-ΠΕΠ)
  - 101st Artillery Battalion (101 ΜΠΜΠ)
  - 88th Anti Aircraft Artillery Battalion (88 ΜΑ/ΑΠ)
  - 88th Engineer Battalion (88 ΤΜΧ)
  - 88th Medical Corps Battalion (88 ΤΥΓ)
  - 88th Signal Company (88 ΛΔΒ)
  - 88th Anti Τank Company (88 ΛΑΤ)
  - 88th Support Battalion (88 ΤΥΠ)

== Motto ==
The 88th Military Command's motto Ποιείν α κελεύει πατρίς (transl. (to) do what your country commands) is an adaptation of a phrase attributed to Socrates: ποιητέον ἃ ἂν κελεύῃ ἡ πόλις καὶ ἡ πατρίς (Crito, 51b-51c), you must do whatever the state, your country, commands (transl. by Harold North Fowler).
