= 98th National Guard Higher Command (Greece) =

98th National Guard Higher Command "Archipelago"
- 98η Ανώτερη Διοίκηση Ταγμάτων Εθνοφυλακής «ΑΡΧΙΠΕΛΑΓΟΥΣ» (98 ΑΔΤΕ)
- Camp flag of the 98th National Guard Higher Command
- Active: 1945–present
- Country: Greece
- Branch: Hellenic Army
- Type: Mechanized infantry
- Size: Division
- Part of: Supreme Military Command of Interior and Islands
- Garrison/HQ: Lesbos, Aegean Islands
- Mottos: ΑΝΔΡΕΣ ΓΑΡ ΠΟΛΙΟΣ ΠΥΡΓΟΣ; Andres Gár Pólios Pýrgos; Men are the City's Towers

The 98th National Guard Higher Command "Archipelago" (Greek: 98 Ανώτερη Διοίκηση Ταγμάτων Εθνοφυλακής «ΑΡΧΙΠΕΛΑΓΟΥΣ», 98 ΑΔΤΕ; 98 Anóteri Dioíkisi Tagmáton Ethnofylakís "Archipelágous", abbrev. 98 ADTE), is a Hellenic Army mechanized infantry division-sized command responsible for the defence of the island of Lesbos, Greece.

== History ==
At the conclusion of World War II, the 120th National Guard Command (Greek: 120 Διοίκηση Ταγμάτων Εθνοφυλακής, romanized: 120 Dioíkisi Tagmáton Ethnofylakís) was formed in Lesbos, overseeing the territorial National Guard battalions - predominantly reservist and militia units - based on the island. This formation evolved, on 20 April 1975, into the 98th Military Command (Greek: 98 Στρατιωτική Διοίκηση, 98 ΣΔΙ, romanized: 98 Stratiotikí Dioíkisi, 98 SDI), and again on 12 March 1978, into the 98th National Guard Higher Command, consisting of two infantry regiments (22nd and 36th), with artillery and armored support elements. Despite its "National Guard" moniker, which honors the formation's previous territorial incarnations, the 98 ADTE evolved through the 1980s and 1990s into a mechanized infantry division. In October 2009 the 98 ADTE was given the honorific title "Archipelago" in commemoration of the World War I-era Archipelago Division.

== Emblem and motto ==
The emblem of the 98th National Guard Higher Command is a lion facing east, above a graphic depiction of the island of Lesbos.

The division's motto is Men are the City's Towers (Greek: ΑΝΔΡΕΣ ΓΑΡ ΠΟΛΙΟΣ ΠΥΡΓΟΣ, Άνδρες γαρ πόλιος πύργος; Andres Gár Pólios Pýrgos). The phrase is attributed to Greek lyric poet Alcaeus of Mytilene, a native of Lesbos, and is taken from his political songs, or Stasiotika (Greek: Στασιωτικά).

== Structure ==
- 98th National Guard Higher Command (98 ΑΔΤΕ), based at Lesbos
  - HQ Company (ΛΣΤ/98 ΑΔΤΕ)
  - 398th National Guard Armored Battalion (398 ΕΑΡΜΕΘ)
  - 2nd National Guard Armored Reconnaissance Battalion (B ΕΑNΕΘ)
  - 221st National Guard Mechanized Battalion (221 M/K ΤΕ)
  - 263rd National Guard Mechanized Battalion (263 M/K ΤΕ)
  - 264th National Guard Mechanized Battalion (264 M/K ΤΕ)
  - 265th National Guard Mechanized Battalion (265 M/K ΤΕ)
  - 296th National Guard Mechanized Battalion (296 M/K ΤΕ)
  - 98th National Guard Artillery Battalion (98 MΕΘ)
  - 98th National Guard Anti Aircraft Artillery Battalion (98 MΕAΠ)
  - 475th National Guard Signal Battalion (475 ΤΔΒΕΘ)
  - 98th National Guard Anti Τank Company (98 ΛΑΤΕΘ)
  - 98th National Guard Supply Battalion (98 ΤΥΛΠΕΘ)
  - 98th National Guard Support Battalion (98 ΤΥΠΕΘ)
  - 98th National Guard Medical Battalion (98 ΤΥΓΕΘ)

== Sources ==
- Στρατός και Ενημέρωση, ΑΠΡ-ΜΑΪ-ΙΟΥ 2016 (PDF) (in Greek). Hellenic Army Information and Public Relations Directorate. June 2016.
