= Supreme Military Command of the Interior and Islands =

Supreme Military Command of the Aegean and Eastern Mediterranean
- Ανώτατη Στρατιωτική Διοίκηση Αιγαίου και Ανατολικής Μεσογείου (ΑΣΔΑΑΜ)
- Emblem of ASDAAM
- Active: 1945–present
- Country: Greece
- Branch: Hellenic Army
- Size: Army Corps
- Part of: Hellenic Army General Staff
- Garrison/HQ: Athens, Attica
- Mottos: Defending One's Country; ΑΜΥΝΕΣΘΑΙ ΠΕΡΙ ΠΑΤΡΗΣ; Aminesthe peri patris

Commanders
- Current commander: Lt. General Dimitros Vakendis

The Supreme Military Command of the Aegean and Eastern Mediterranean (Greek: Ανώτατη Στρατιωτική Διοίκηση Αιγαίου και Ανατολικής Μεσογείου, ΑΣΔAAM), more commonly known as ASDAAM, is a Corps-sized formation of the Hellenic Army responsible for the defence of the Aegean Islands and the Eastern Mediterranean .

== History ==
Formed in Athens in 1945 as the Higher Military Command of Attica (Greek: Ανωτέρα Στρατιωτική Διοίκηση Αττικής, ΑΣΔΑ; Anotéra Stratiotikí Deíkisi Attikís, ASDA), by 1961 it had evolved from a territorial defence force to a Corps-sized formation, overseeing the Aegean region's four National Guard Commands. It was soon renamed to the Supreme Military Command of the Interior and Islands (Greek: Ανωτάτη Στρατιωτική Διοίκηση Εσωτερικού και Νήσων, ΑΣΔΕΝ; Anotati Stratiotikí Deíkisi Esoterikoú ke Níson, ASDEN) to reflect the expansion of its role.

In 1995, the command's headquarters were relocated to the suburb of Karea in Athens, Attica, and by 2005 it had become a major operational formation of the Hellenic Army, consisting of two division and five brigade-strength, mechanized, National Guard Battalion Higher Commands (Greek: Ανώτερη Διοίκηση Ταγμάτων Εθνοφυλακής, ΑΔΤΕ; Anóteri Deíkisi Tagmáton Ethnofylakís, ADTE). After a wide-ranging defense review in 2013, the Corps' capabilities were strengthened with the 5th Infantry Brigade reorganized as an air assault brigade to become ASDEN's rapid reaction force.

On October 3, 2025, ASDEN “Aegeas” was renamed the Supreme Military Command of the Aegean and Eastern Mediterranean (ASDAAM).

== Emblem and motto ==
The emblem of the ASDEN depicts the Lion Gate of Mycenae. It symbolizes power through unity.

The Corps' motto, Defending One's Country (Greek: ΑΜΥΝΕΣΘΑΙ ΠΕΡΙ ΠΑΤΡΗΣ; Amýnesthae Perí Pátris), is from Homer's Iliad, attributed to the Trojan Prince Hector in the final days of the Trojan War, when Polydamas advised him to stop the attack on the Achaeans because the omens were not auspicious. Hector replied "There's one good omen, defending one's country!" (Greek: «Εις οιωνός άριστος αμύνεσθαι περί πάτρης»).

== Structure ==
ASDAAM locations
- Supreme Military Command of the Aegean and Eastern Mediterranean (ASDAAM), in Athens (Attica)
  - ASDAAM Command Company (ΛΣ/ΑΣΔΑΑΜ), in Athens, (Attica)
  - 5th Airmobile Brigade (5 A/M ΤΑΞ "V Μεραρχία Κρητών"), in Chania (Crete)
  - 79th National Guard Higher Command (79 ΑΔΤΕ), in Samos
  - 80th National Guard Higher Command (80 ΑΔΤΕ), in Kos (Dodecanese)
  - 88th Military Command (88 ΣΔΙ), in Lemnos
  - 95th National Guard Higher Command (95 ΑΔΤΕ), in Rhodes, (Dodecanese)
  - 96th National Guard Higher Command (96 ΑΔΤΕ), in Chios
  - 98th National Guard Higher Command (98 ΑΔΤΕ), in Lesbos
  - ASDAAM Artillery Command (ΔΠΒ/ΑΣΔΑΑΜ), in Athens, (Attica)
  - ASDAAM Engineer Command (ΔΜΧ/ΑΣΔΑΑΜ), in Athens, (Attica)
  - 2nd Signal, EW, IT, and Surveillance Center (2ο ΣΕΗΠΠΕΠ), in Athens, (Attica)
  - 291st Recruits Training Center (291o KEN), in Syros, Cyclades

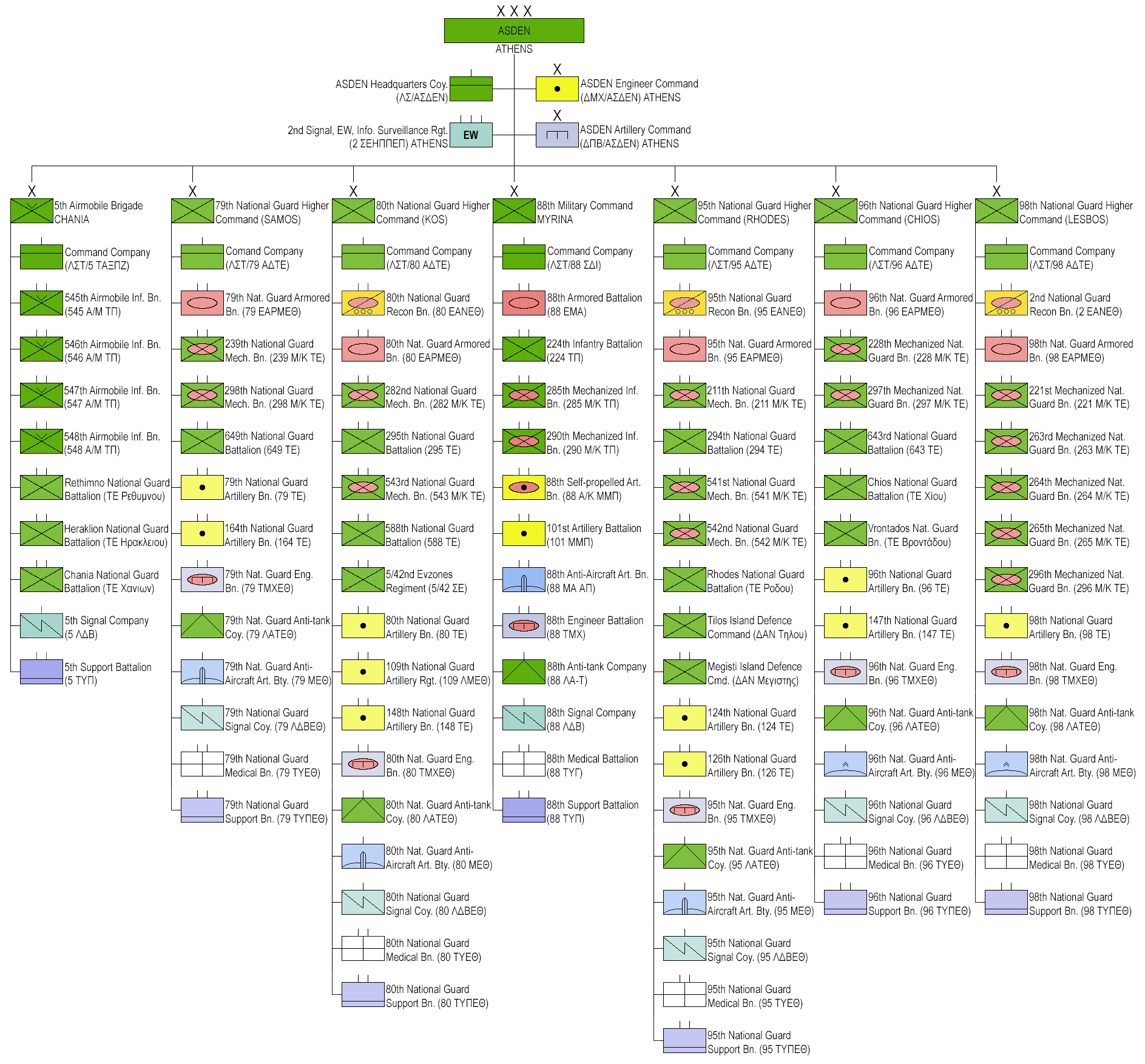
Supreme Military Command of the Interior & Islands organization 2025
