= Greek Armed Forces in the Middle East =

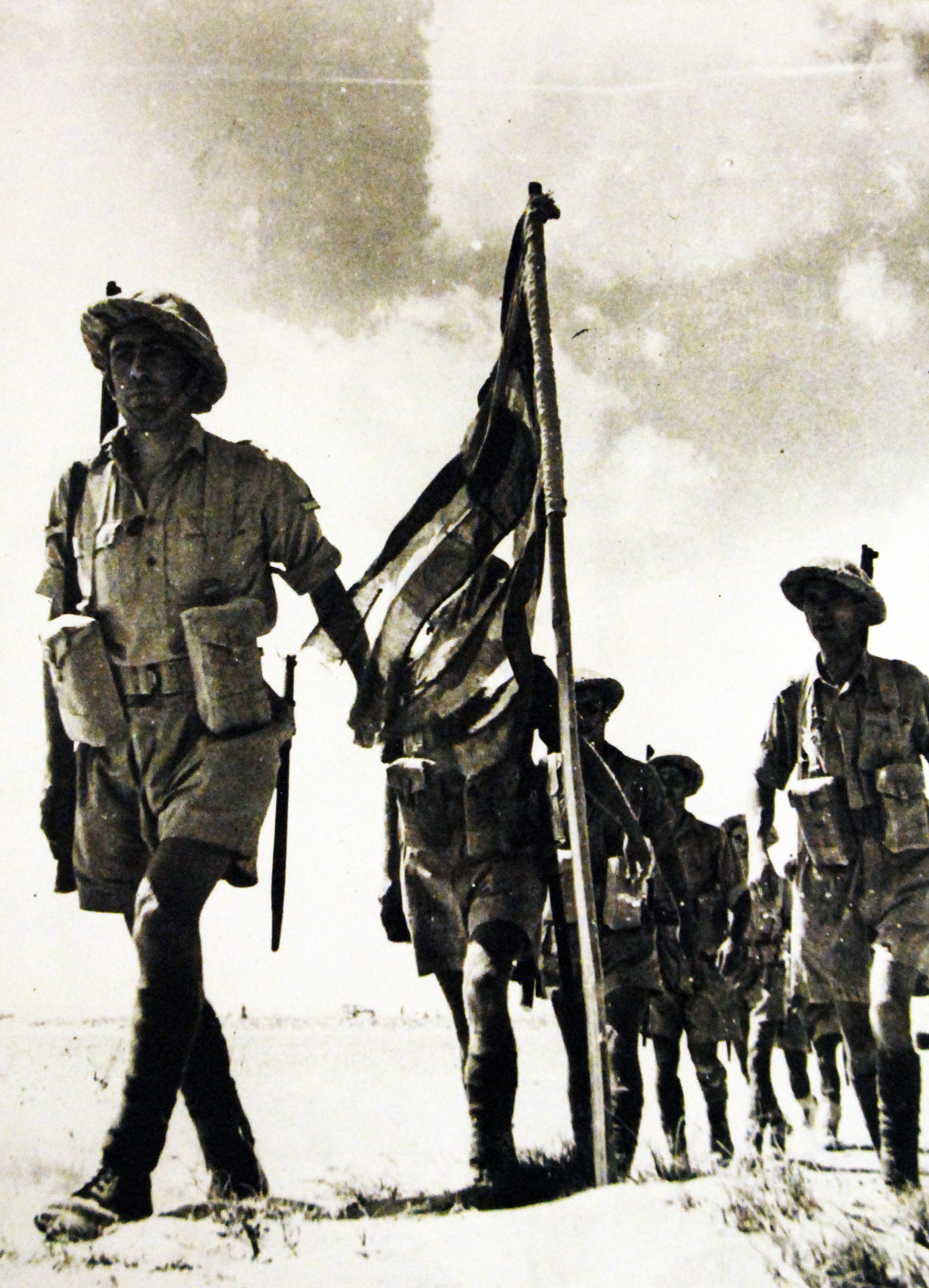
Greek soldiers with flag in North Africa

After the fall of Greece to the Axis powers in April–May 1941, elements of the Greek Armed Forces managed to escape to the British-controlled Middle East. There they were placed under the Greek government in exile, and continued the fight alongside the Allies until the liberation of Greece in October 1944. These are known in Greek history as the Greek Armed Forces in the Middle East (Ελληνικές Ένοπλες Δυνάμεις Μέσης Ανατολής).

== Army ==
In the face of the overwhelming German advance into Greece, several thousand Greek officers and soldiers were either evacuated, along with the Greek government, to Crete and then Egypt, in April–May 1941, or managed to flee, mainly via neutral Turkey, to the British-controlled Middle East.

There a Greek army in exile started being formed, under British command and re-equipped with British arms. The core of this new military force was the "Phalanx of Egyptiote Greeks", from the Greek community in Egypt. On 15 June 1941, the "Headquarters of the Royal Hellenic Army in the Middle East" (Αρχηγείου Βασιλικού Ελληνικού Στρατού Μέσης Ανατολής, ΑΒΕΣΜΑ) was established. This provided the framework for the initial development of the Greek armed forces in exile until May 1942, when the Greek government-in-exile established a Ministry of National Defence, and began re-forming the Hellenic Army General Staff and Army Inspectorates.

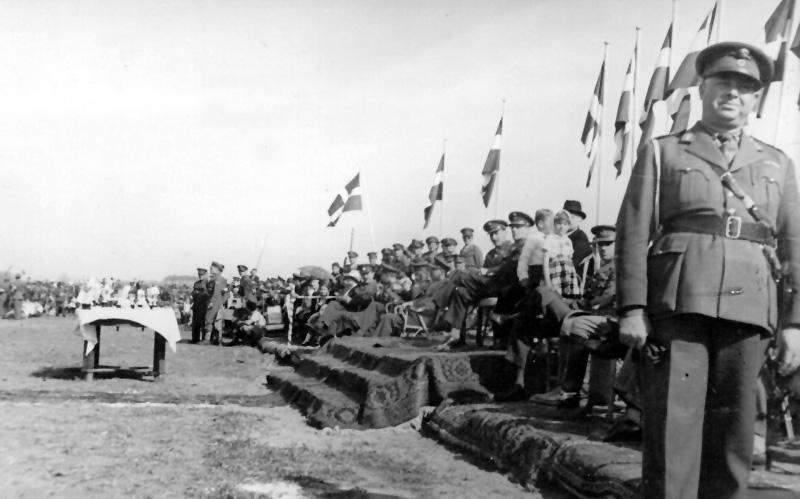
George II of Greece visits Greek soldiers in Netanya, Palestine, 1944

Already in late June 1941, the 1st Greek Brigade began being formed. By June 1942 it numbered 6,018 men. It comprised three infantry battalions, an artillery regiment (of battalion size), and support units. An independent armoured car regiment (of battalion size) was also formed, but later incorporated in the Brigade's artillery regiment. The Brigade remained in training camps in Palestine until May 1942, where its command was taken over by Colonel Pafsanias Katsotas. It was then transferred to Syria, before being deployed to Egypt in August.

The 1st Brigade was placed under British 50th Division, under whose command it participated in the Second Battle of El Alamein, before being transferred to the British 44th Division. The brigade fought in the battle and the subsequent operations until 19 December, when it returned to Egypt. It suffered 89 dead and 228 wounded.

A 2nd Greek Brigade also began being formed in Egypt in May 1942 along similar lines, along with a 2nd Artillery Battalion. By January 1943 it numbered 5,583 men, raising hopes that a full infantry division could be formed. This did not take place, as the men for a third brigade were not available.

In early 1943, 500 Metaxist officers under Colonel Vagenas founded the "Nemesis" secret organisation. Their goal was to overthrow the Greek government in exile and replace it with politicians sympathetic to the 4th of August Regime, as well as ousting all non-monarchist officers from the military. In the middle of February, Metaxist officers demanded the removal of the commanders of the 2nd Brigade. Members of the pro-EAM Antifascist Military Organisation (ASO) immediately protested those demands. In a coordinated effort over 48 Metaxist officers submitted their resignations, demanding the removal of non-monarchist officers from their positions and a reshuffle of the government. ASO members reacted by arresting the officers who resigned. Minister of Defence Panagiotis Kanellopoulos ordered the 1st Brigade to restore order in the 2nd Brigade by force, authorising the arrest of 28 ASO affiliated officers. Encouraged by this move Metaxist officers began resigning in all units of the military except the navy which was out at sea. ASO members arrested and disarmed Metaxist officers in their units while Katsotas refused to intervene. This prompted Kanellopoulos to telegraph his resignation to London and depart for Cairo. British 9th Army commander General William Holmes likewise refused to suppress ASO by force, instead sending the Metaxist officers who had submitted a resignation to a special camp in Syria.

Finally, on 6 July 1943 a pro-EAM mutiny in the 2nd Brigade was left with only one battalion of about 200–250 men, with the other two used to replenish the losses of 1st Brigade to 4,718 men.

On 6 April 1944, 1st Brigade too suffered a widespread pro-EAM mutiny. Subsequently, both units were disbanded by the British, and their personnel interned in camps or used in non-combat duties. 3,500 politically reliable officers and men were formed into the 3rd Greek Mountain Brigade under Col. Thrasyvoulos Tsakalotos, on 4 June 1944. This unit was embarked for Italy in August and fought with distinction, particularly at the Battle of Rimini, where it earned the honorific Rimini Brigade. This battle-hardened unit would later be instrumental in the struggle between the British-backed government and the EAM-ELAS forces.

In September 1942, an elite special forces unit, the Sacred Band (Ιερός Λόχος), was formed, made up solely of officers and volunteers. Under its charismatic leader, Col. Christodoulos Tsigantes, it was attached to the 1st SAS Regiment, and participated in raids in Libya. In February 1943, the unit was placed under the orders of General Philippe Leclerc, and participated in the Tunisia Campaign. From May to October 1943, the Sacred Band was re-trained in airborne and amphibious operations, and for the remainder of the war it was employed in operations against the German garrisons of the Aegean islands. The unit was disbanded in Athens, on 7 August 1945.

== Navy ==
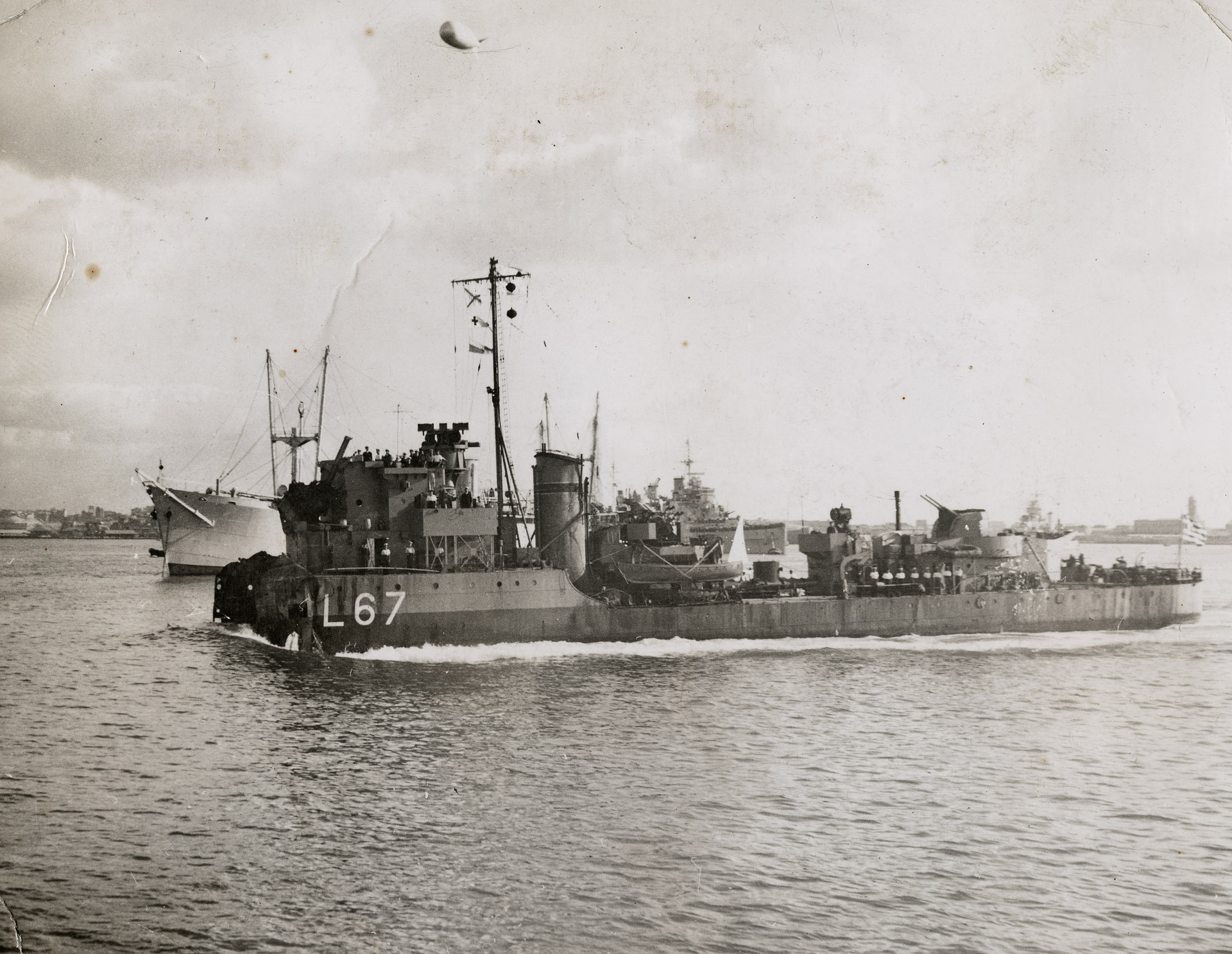
RHN Adrias entering the port of Alexandria at the end of a journey of 1,000 miles after losing her bow

The Hellenic Royal Navy suffered enormous casualties during the German invasion, losing over 20 ships, mostly to German air attacks, within a few days in April 1941. Its chief, Vice Admiral Alexandros Sakellariou, managed to save some of its ships, including the cruiser Averof, six destroyers, five submarines and several support ships, by evacuating them to Alexandria. The fleet was subsequently expanded by several destroyers, submarines, mine-sweepers and other vessels handed over by the British Royal Navy, until it became, with 44 ships and over 8,500 men, the second-largest Allied Navy in the Mediterranean after the RN, accounting for 80% of all non-RN operations.

Greek ships served in convoy escort duties in the Indian Ocean, the Mediterranean (where it succeeded in destroying a few enemy submarines), the Atlantic and Arctic Oceans. RHN ships also participated in the landing operations in Sicily, Anzio and Normandy, as well as at the ill-fated Dodecanese Campaign. A significant moment in the RHN's history was the acceptance of the Italian Fleet's surrender in September 1943, alongside the British Royal Navy. Two of the most notable Greek warships of the war were the destroyers Adrias and Vasilissa Olga. One destroyer and three submarines were RHN's casualties. The large Greek merchant navy, likewise, contributed enormously to the Allied war effort from the first day of the war, losing over 2,500 men and 60% of its ships in the process.

When the pro-EAM April 1944 mutiny broke out, a large part of the Navy joined it. These ships were stormed by Greek officers loyal to the government-in-exile and recaptured. Eleven seamen were killed, others wounded, and many were subsequently interned. Thus, when the Navy returned to liberated Greece in October 1944, it was firmly behind the government of George Papandreou.

== Air Force ==
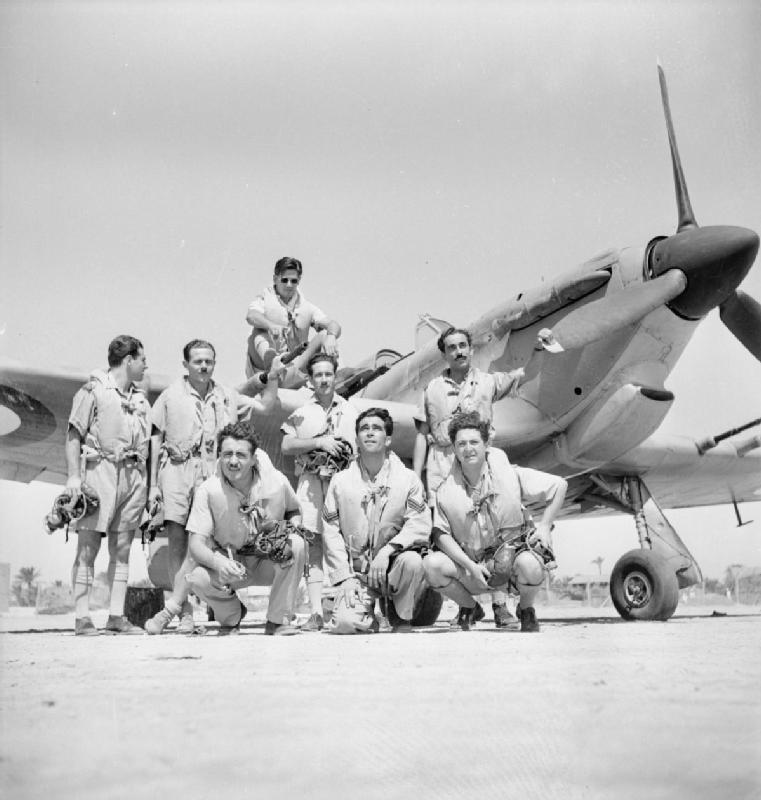
Greek pilots of the 335th Fighter Squadron at Dhekeila, Egypt (1942)

The few Air Force personnel that managed to escape eventually constituted the 13th Light Bomber and the 335th and 336th Fighter squadrons, operating under the Desert Air Force in North Africa and Italy, before being repatriated in late 1944.

13th Light Bomber Squadron was formed in June 1941 in Egypt as a naval cooperation unit, using the 5 surviving Avro Ansons of the former RHAF 13th Naval Cooperation Squadron. The Squadron was initially reequipped with Blenheims IV, later Blenheim V and finally with Baltimores. 335 Squadron was formed on 10 October 1941, while 336 Squadron on 25 February 1943. Both were initially equipped with Hurricanes, mostly of the Mk. IIc type, until they were re-equipped with Spitfire Mk Vb and Vc in January 1944.

== See also ==
- Yugoslav Army Outside the Homeland

== Bibliography ==
- Athanasiadis, Giorgis (1971). Η Πρώτη Πράξη της Ελληνικής Τραγωδίας [The First Act of the Greek Tragedy] (in Greek). Eleutheri Ellada. OCLC 66166774.
- Η ιστορία της οργάνωσης του Ελληνικού Στρατού, 1821–1954 [History of the Organization of the Hellenic Army, 1821–1954] (in Greek). Athens: Hellenic Army Historical Directorate. 2005. ISBN 960-7897-45-5.
- Η ιστορία του Πεζικού (Στρατιωτικός Κανονισμός 900-21) [History of the Infantry (Military Regulation 900-21)] (in Greek). Athens: Hellenic Army Infantry Directorate/3a. 2014.
- Stavrianos, L. S. (1950). "The Mutiny in the Greek Armed Forces, April, 1944". American Slavic and East European Review. 9 (4): 302–311. doi:10.2307/2492150. ISSN 1049-7544. JSTOR 2492150.
