= Ignatios Kallergis =

20th-century Greek soldier

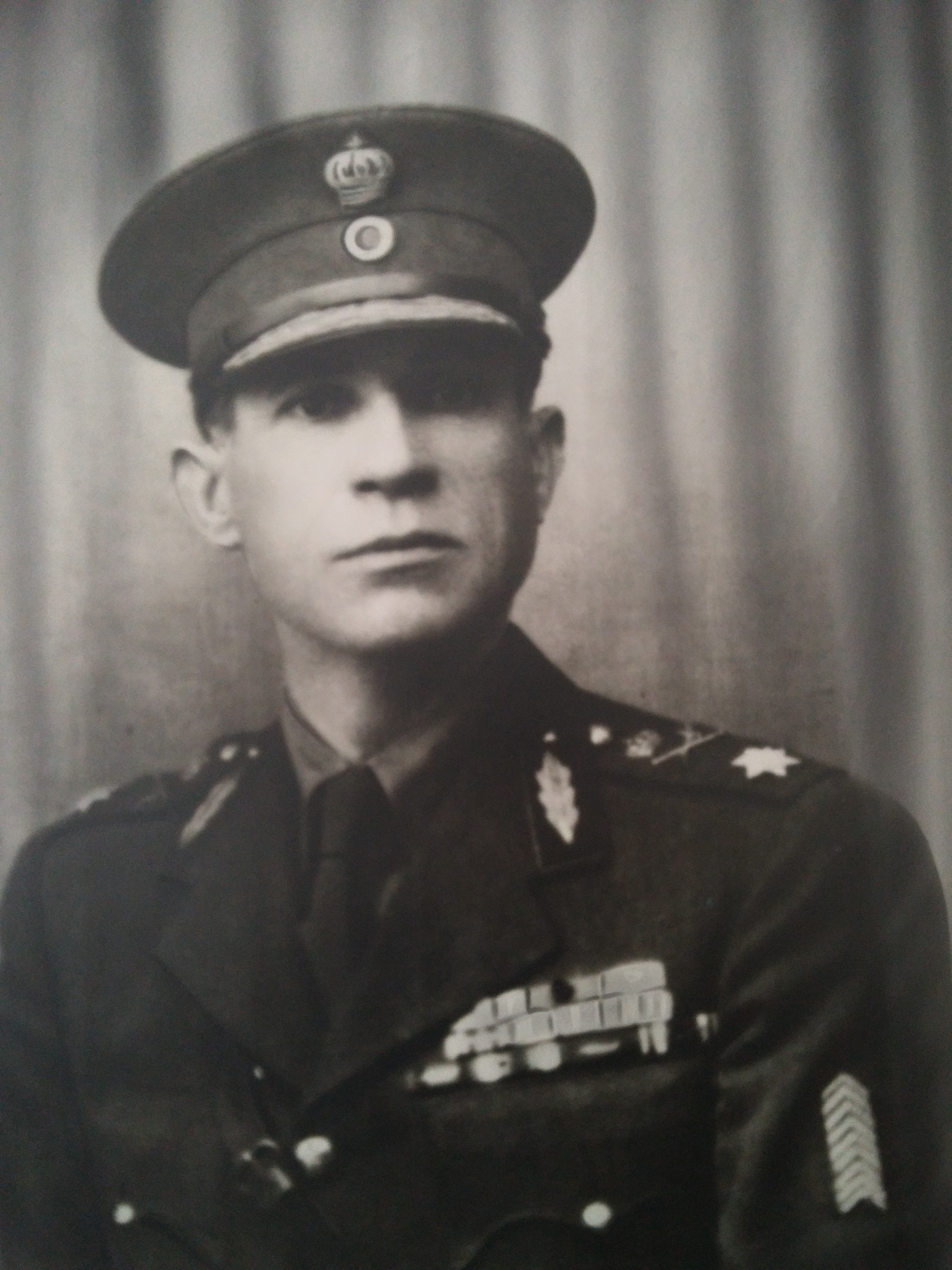
Ignatios Kallergis

Ignatios Kallergis (Greek: Ιγνάτιος Καλλέργης) (Larissa, 1892 – 1964) was an officer of the Greek Army. He reached the rank of major general, participating in the Balkan Wars, the Allied intervention in Southern Russia and the Asia Minor Campaign. He played an important role in Greek Armed Forces in the Middle East. He took part in nine crucial battles and was honored with almost every Greek medal for valour. He married Elpida Karimali and had two children, Elizabeth and Konstantinos (Professor of Medicine, Aristotle University of Thessaloniki).
