= Raid on Symi =

World War II Allied raid of Greek island

- Part of the Battle of the Mediterranean of World War II
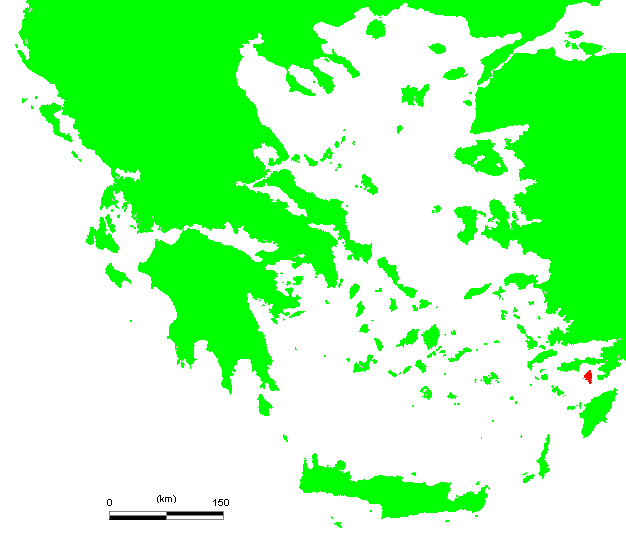
- Location of Symi
Date	13–15 July 1944
Location	Symi, Aegean islands
Result	Allied victory

Belligerents
Greece; United Kingdom	Germany; Italian Social Republic

Commanders and leaders
Christodoulos Tsigantes; Ian Lapraik	Unknown

Units involved
Sacred Band; Special Boat Service	Garrison company

Casualties and losses
8 wounded; 2 drowned	21 killed; 151 captured; 1 E-boat sunk 2 barges sunk; 19 caïques destroyed

The Raid on Symi also known as Operation Tenement took place from 13 to 15 July 1944 as part of the Mediterranean Campaign in World War II. The action was a combined operation conducted by two Allied special forces, the British Special Boat Service and the Greek Sacred Band, who raided the German and Italian garrisons at the island of Symi in the Aegean Sea.

During the incursion the German and Italian troops in the island were overwhelmed and the military facilities and German vessels destroyed within a few days. After achieving a total success, the British and Greek forces evacuated Symi as planned.

== Background ==
In September–October 1943, during the Dodecanese Campaign the Germans ousted the British from the Italian-held Dodecanese islands. In the course of these operations, on 12 October 1943 the island of Symi was occupied by German troops.

In April 1943, 1st SAS was divided into two, with 250 men from the SAS and the Small Scale Raiding Force forming the Special Boat Squadron under the command of Major the Earl Jellicoe. They moved to Haifa and trained with the Greek Sacred Band for operations in the Aegean. They hid in Turkey—officially neutral, the Turks knew about and tolerated these operations—and used the small offshore islands as their bases.

The force allocated to raid Symi was 100 men of the SBS led by Major Ian "Jock" Lapraik and another 224 men from the Greek Sacred Band trained and armed by the British. They were split into three forces and had objectives to take, one of which was a heavily defended castle.

== Raid ==
The British and Greek forces from ten motor launchers and supported by schooners and caïques landed unopposed and by dawn all three forces were overlooking their respective targets. As soon as light took effect the attack began, first on the harbour defences with mortars and machine guns; the German garrison was taken by surprise. Two German barges which had followed the British boats came into the harbour only to be overwhelmed by gunfire, after which they were sunk.

The other objective was the high point known as Molo Point: SBS men took the hill without much opposition but they were counterattacked by a German force retreating from the main town. Running up the hill, the Germans soon encountered heavy small arms fire and grenades. A Greek platoon below cut them off and as a result they surrendered.

The last objective was the castle just above the harbour where fire was concentrated with Vickers machine guns and mortars opening up on the battlements. While crossing a bridge SBS men became pinned down and had to stay there for a while. Fighting was bitter and the majority of the casualties were taken in this area, but mortar fire was concentrated on the castle. A captured German officer and a Royal naval Lieutenant seconded to the SBS called out for the castle to surrender and after three hours of further fighting an Italian Carabinieri unit walked out and surrendered.

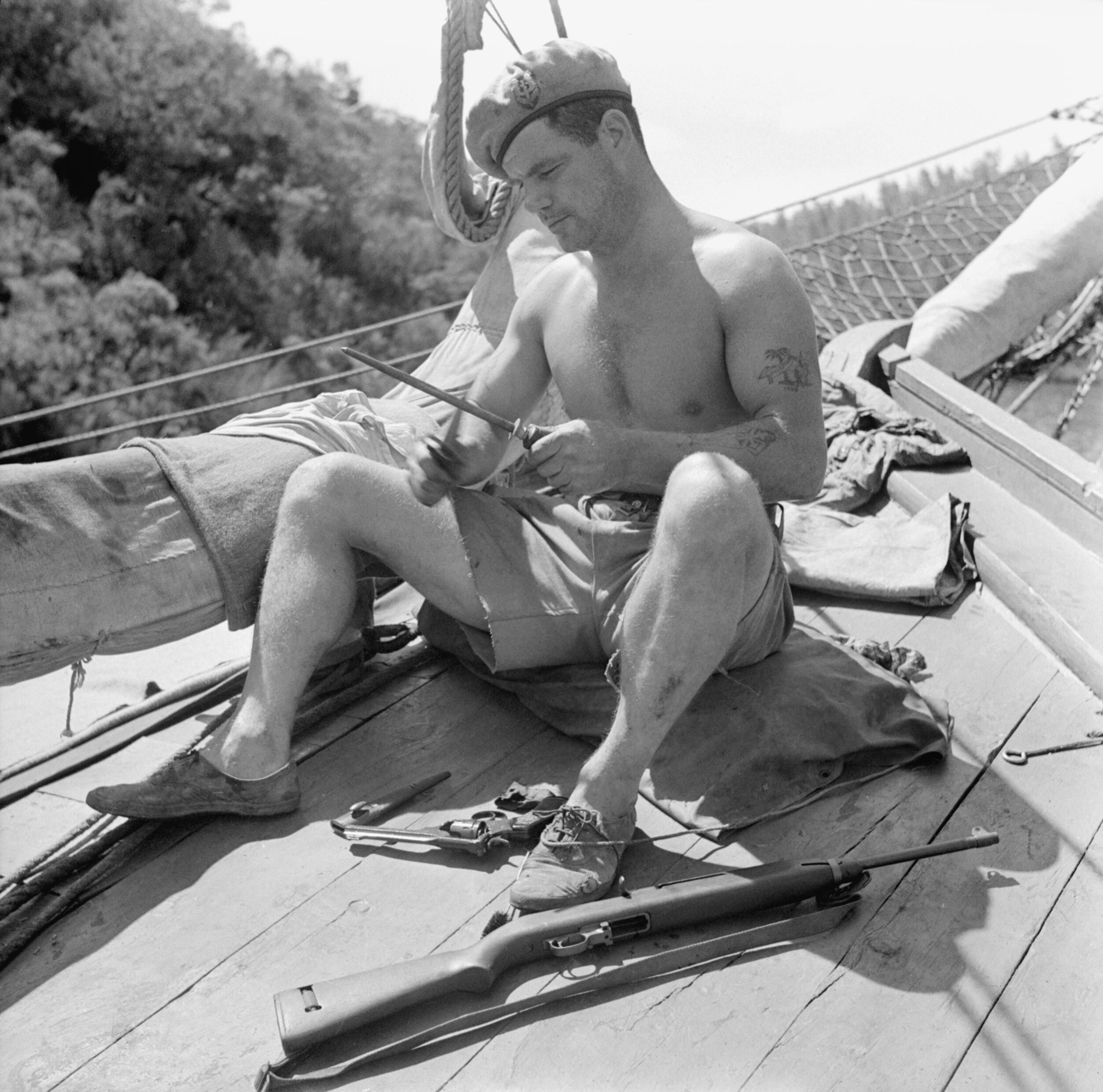
An SBS Corporal before the raid

Further inland, the German position in Panormitis Monastery was attacked and the men driven out, who only surrendered when they came to a promontory by the sea. The island was thus secured and mopping up was done on other possible strong points on the island.

With this consolidation, the SBS began planting demolition charges on gun emplacements, ammunition, and fuel and explosive dumps. Even the harbour wasn't spared: altogether nineteen German caiques, some displacing 150 tons, were destroyed. During this time the Luftwaffe made a number of attacks on the island but to little effect.

With all objectives taken it was decided to evacuate the island and the Greeks and the SBS withdrew with the booty and prisoners. A small section of SBS remained on the island until the last possible moment. Two German motor launches attempted to land but the SBS opened fire, setting the two ships on fire as they tried to withdraw. The last of the men to leave on a barge ran into an E-Boat but with enough captured weapons and ammunition they were able to open fire and sink the vessel for no loss.

== Aftermath ==
Operation Tenement was completely successful and gained far more achievements than it set out. For the Germans the raid forced them to put more troops in the area and as a result a much larger garrison was placed on Symi. The raid was the last of its kind in the Aegean for the SBS and as a result the Greek Sacred Band took over the role of raiding in the Aegean as they were now fully trained and politically reliable.

In August 1944 the SBS joined the Long Range Desert Group in further operations in the Adriatic, on the Peloponnese, in Albania, and, finally, in Istria. So effective were they that by 1944, 200–300 SBS and men of the Greek Sacred Band held down six German divisions.

At the end of World War II, the surrender of German forces in the region under General Otto Wagener to the British took place on Symi and the island was subject to two years of occupation by them. In 1948 Symi was finally united with Greece.

== See also ==
- Raid on Santorini
