= Konstantinos Korkas =

Greek general (1921–2022)

Konstantinos Korkas (Greek: Κωνσταντίνος Κόρκας, 1921 – 29 May 2022) was a highly decorated Greek special forces soldier who reached the rank of lieutenant general. He was the last surviving member of the World War II-era Sacred Band.

== Life ==
Konstantinos Korkas was born in the village of Poullitsa in Corinthia in 1921. He entered the Hellenic Army Academy in 1940, shortly before the outbreak of the Greco-Italian War. With his classmates, he fled the German invasion of Greece in April 1941 to Crete, where he fought in the Battle of Crete. He fled to the Middle East, where he continued his studies in the exiled Army Academy, graduating in 1943 as an infantry second lieutenant.

As a member of the exiled Greek Armed Forces in the Middle East, he fought in the North African Campaign in 1942–43, and in the raids of the Greek Sacred Band against the German-occupied Aegean islands in 1943–45. During the subsequent Greek Civil War, he commanded the 14th Mountain Raider Company in 1947–49, being wounded twice.

He served in various NATO positions, as well as defence attache in Romania and Hungary in 1968–1970. He commanded the III Amphibious Raider Squadron in 1954–55, the 3rd Infantry Regiment in 1971–72, the 11th Infantry Division in 1973–74, and the II Army Corps in 1974–1976. In 1976 he became commander of the reconstituted IV Army Corps, facing the land border with Turkey. He then commanded the First Army, and served as Inspector-General of the Army in 1979–80, before retiring in 1980 with the rank of lieutenant general.

He died on 29 May 2022, immediately after participating in a ceremony honouring fallen members of the Greek special forces. He was the last surviving member of the Sacred Band.

== Awards ==
Lt. General Korkas was highly decorated, receiving the highest Greek award for gallantry, the Cross of Valour in Gold, six times; the War Cross 3rd Class, seven times; the War Cross 2nd class, once; the Distinguished Actions Medal, thrice; and the 3rd and 2nd classes of the Medal for Military Merit. He also received a battlefield promotion for bravery.

He was also decorated with the Gold Cross of the Order of the Phoenix with Swords, and the Commander's Crosses of the Order of the Phoenix and the Royal Order of George I, as well as a British medal and the French Ordre national du Mérite.
