= Ian Lapraik =

- Nickname: Jock
- Born: 13 November 1915; Boroughmuirhead, Scotland
- Died: 15 March 1985 (aged 69) Beaconsfield, England
- Branch: British Army
- Service years: 1940–1973
- Rank: Lieutenant Colonel
- Conflicts: World War II; Raid on Symi

Colonel Ian Lapraik DSO OBE MC TD BL (13 September 1915 – 15 March 1985) was a distinguished officer in the Special Air Service Regiment, despite potentially crippling childhood illness.

== Early life ==
Lapraik was born in Edinburgh, but lived most of his early life in Glasgow. He suffered from tuberculosis of the knee at age seven and had been crippled for five years including two years with his leg in plaster. When he was at university, he was still thought to be too "fragile" for vigorous sports, although he had worked on his strength by running. He was also excluded from the Officer Training Corps, despite having achieved distinction as a runner in international inter-student games.

Lapraik was educated at the High School of Glasgow (1927–1934) and Glasgow University. He then qualified as a lawyer.

== Military career ==
Lapraik enlisted in the Highland Light Infantry on 3 September 1939, the day that war was declared against Germany. After training at the reputedly tough Officer Cadet Training Unit at Dunbar, he was commissioned in the Cameron Highlanders in 1941. In the same year he saw action with 51 Commando in Ethiopia, then known as Abyssinia, and won the Military Cross and the Ethiopian Lion of Judah.

In June 1943, he joined the newly formed Special Boat Squadron (SBS), based near Haifa, commanded by Lord Jellicoe. In 1943 he commanded an SBS unit operating from bases in Turkish waters. Notable among his successes was an attack with the Greek Sacred Squadron on Symi, when the German garrison was decimated and all their installations destroyed. For this and other actions, he was awarded a bar to his Military Cross.

In 1944, the Squadron was expanded to Regimental status, though still part of the SAS group. The unit was now styled the Special Boat Service, and the three operational Detachments were likewise expanded into Squadrons: Major Lapraik commanded M Squadron. In 1945, he was awarded the DSO, in recognition of his courage and leadership. He was then attached to the Greek Sacred Regiment Sacred Squadron, which had also been expanded from its original Squadron status, and remained with them until the end of the war. This was a very difficult period in Greek history and his service was further recognised by the award of Officer of the Order of the British Empire from Britain, and the Order of the Phoenix from Greece. He also received the Greek War Cross, 2nd Class (Β' τάξεως) for his earlier operations. His skill in watermanship was legendary. He once paddled a canoe from Malta to Sicily, a distance of 70 miles, and on one occasion even managed to control a canoe in a force-nine gale.

He was six times mentioned in despatches; wounded six times; captured three times but always escaped. After the war, the SAS and the SBS were disbanded from the regular establishment, but in 1947 the SAS returned, as a unit of the Territorial Army. This unit was 21 SAS (V) and Major Lapraik now commanded B Squadron, whose senior ranks were composed mostly of veterans of the SBS. Between 1973 and 1983, Ian Lapraik was the Honorary Colonel of 21 SAS. The Army Reserve Centre at Bramley Training Area is named Lapraik House and the base for C Sqn.

In his civilian life, Ian Lapraik worked in publishing. He died in Buckinghamshire on 15 March 1985.

== Honours and awards ==
- Distinguished Service Order 18 October 1945
- Officer of the Order of the British Empire 9 August 1945
- Military Cross 19 August 1941, and Bar 3 February 1944
- Territorial Efficiency Decoration 14 September 1956
- Mentioned in Despatches 25 January 1945
- Lion of Judah (Abyssinia)
- War Cross (Greece), 2nd Class (14 October 1949)
