= Ioannis Kellas =

Greek aviator and Hellenic Air Force officer

- Ioannis Kellas (wearing side cap) with other members of the 335th Sqdr celebrating the successful bombing of the Italian XX Corps HQ, Oct. 28, 1942
- Born: 1908; Trikala, Greece
- Died: 1966 (aged 57–58)
- Military career
- Allegiance: Greece
- Branch: Hellenic Air Force
- Service years: 1930–1948
- Rank: Sminarchos
- Nickname: Eagle of Trikala
- Commands: 21st Pursuit Squadron (1940–1941); 335th Squadron (1942)

Ioannis Kellas (Greek: Ιωάννης Κέλλας, 1908-1966) was a Greek aviator and Hellenic Air Force officer during World War II.

== Career ==
Kellas was born in Trikala, Greece and graduated the Greek Military Academy in Athens. In the following Greek-Italian War (October 28, 1940 to April 7, 1941), he was positioned as commander of the 21st Pursuit Squadron, initially based on the airfield of Thessaloniki, but then moved to Vasiliki, near Kalabaka, central Greece.

At the outbreak of the war his squadron comprised 12 PZL P.24 fighters. Kellas got involved in several dogfights with the Italian Regia Aeronautica aircraft. At November 20, he had his first success by hitting a bomber over lake Prespa. During December 1940, while Italian pressure was continuous, the 21st Pursuit Squadron was equipped with Gloster Gladiator aircraft from the Royal Air Force. In February 1941, during a patrol mission over the Permet-Kelcyre sector, southern Albania, Kellas shot down two enemy fighters.

At April 15, during the German invasion, Kellas was hit by a Messerschmitt Bf 109 of the Luftwaffe and made an emergency landing. He managed to escape to North Africa where he served as commander of the 335th Greek Squadron. In one occasion on October 28, 1942, 12 Hurricanes of the 335th squadron under Kellas performed a strafing attack on the Italian XX Corps headquarters, an operation that was a huge morale booster for the expatriate Greeks during the Second Battle of El Alamein.

After the war Kellas followed a short career with Civil Aviation as a pilot of Olympic Airways.
