= 13th Light Bomber Squadron =

- The unofficial Squadron Badge of 13th Light Bomber Squadron
- Active: 1941–1946
- Country: Greece
- Allegiance: Greece
- Branch: Royal Hellenic Air Force
- Role: Bomber squadron
- Part of: Mediterranean Allied Air Forces

The 13th Light Bomber Squadron (Greek: 13 Μοίρα Ελαφρού Βομβαρδισμού, 13 ΜΕΒ), was one of the three World War II aircraft squadrons in service with the Royal Hellenic Air Force, exiled in the Middle East, that fought under the auspices of the British Royal Air Force. It was the first Greek military unit founded after the German invasion and conquest of Greece in April–May 1941.

== Background ==
After the failed Italian attack against Greece (October 28 – November 13, 1940), the Greek forces counterattacked and penetrated deep into Italian held Albanian territory. However, with the German intervention in April 1941, Greece capitulated.

By April 15, 1941, the Royal Hellenic Air Force was virtually eliminated by the numerically and technically superior German Luftwaffe. Part of the Greek air force personnel managed to escape to Egypt together with five Avro Anson aircraft. These aircraft formed the 13th Light Bomber Squadron during the summer of 1941, which was thus the first Greek military unit formed in the Middle East. During the following months two additional Greek squadrons were founded, the 335th and 336th Pursuit Squadrons.

== Activity ==
=== Middle East ===
Its first commander was Squadron Leader Spyros Dakopoulos and its initial personnel was mainly provided from the former 13th Naval Cooperation and 32nd Bomber Squadrons to be finally manned by volunteers recruited from the then large Greek resident communities in Egypt. Its first mission was assigned on July 14, 1941.

At December 1941 the Squadron was equipped with Bristol Blenheims Mk IV and based at Dekheila Airfield. The following months it was reequipped with Blenheims Mk V, which were used primarily for maritime patrol missions. Convoy escort and anti-submarine patrols were the main missions of the Squadron during 1942. In various occasions enemy submarines were spotted in the Eastern Mediterranean and bombed.

Crew of the Squadron on the day of repatriation to Greece, welcomed by the Greek Prime Minister Georgios Papandreou.

From early 1943 the Squadron operated with Martin Baltimores. Apart from anti-submarine patrols and convoy escorts, the Squadron also executed reconnaissance and bombing missions in the occupied Greek islands. At November 12, the fortified German positions at the port of Souda, in Crete, were bombed. In general, the 13th Sqr based in the Middle East counted a total of 1,600 missions with over 4,550 flying hours.

=== Italy and Greece ===
On May 14, 1944, the Squadron was transferred to southern Italy, where operations included bombing of enemy positions in Yugoslavia and Albania, as part of the Allied Balkan Air Force. During this period it executed a total of 1,400 operations that included bombing train stations, bridges, ammunition and fuel depots.

On November 14, while the Axis troops were retreating from Greece, the aircraft of the Squadron landed in Hassani Airfield (later the Hellenikon Air Base and Ellinikon International Airport), near Athens. Although mainland Greece was liberated, Crete and other islands were still under German occupation. Alongside the Spitfire fighters of the two other Greek Squadrons, 335th and 336th, which had also arrived in Greece, the 13th was engaged in bombing missions against the remaining German garrisons in the Aegean islands and Crete (April–May 1945). The Squadron was disbanded on April 19, 1946.

== Sources ==
- Βασίλειος Οικονόμου (Vasilios Oikonomou) (2004). Οι Μοίρες της Ερήμου (The Desert Squadrons) (in Greek). Athens: Πανελλήνιος Σύνδεσμος Βετεράνων Αεροπορίας (Panhellenic League of Air Force Veterans). pp. 26–50.
- Δημήτριος Π. Καγκελάρης (Dimitrios P. Kagelaris) (2008). Ενας έφεδρος αρχισμηνίας πολυβολητής στην Ελληνική Βασιλική Αεροπορία, Περιοδικό Στρατιωτική Ιστορία (A reserve Master Sergeant machine gunner in the Greek Royal Airforce, Military History Magazine (in Greek). Athens: Εκδόσεις Περισκόπιο, Μέρμηγκας Γεώργιος, (Periscope Editions, Mermigas Georgios). pp. 62–68.
