= Cashiering =

Ritual dismissal for breach of discipline

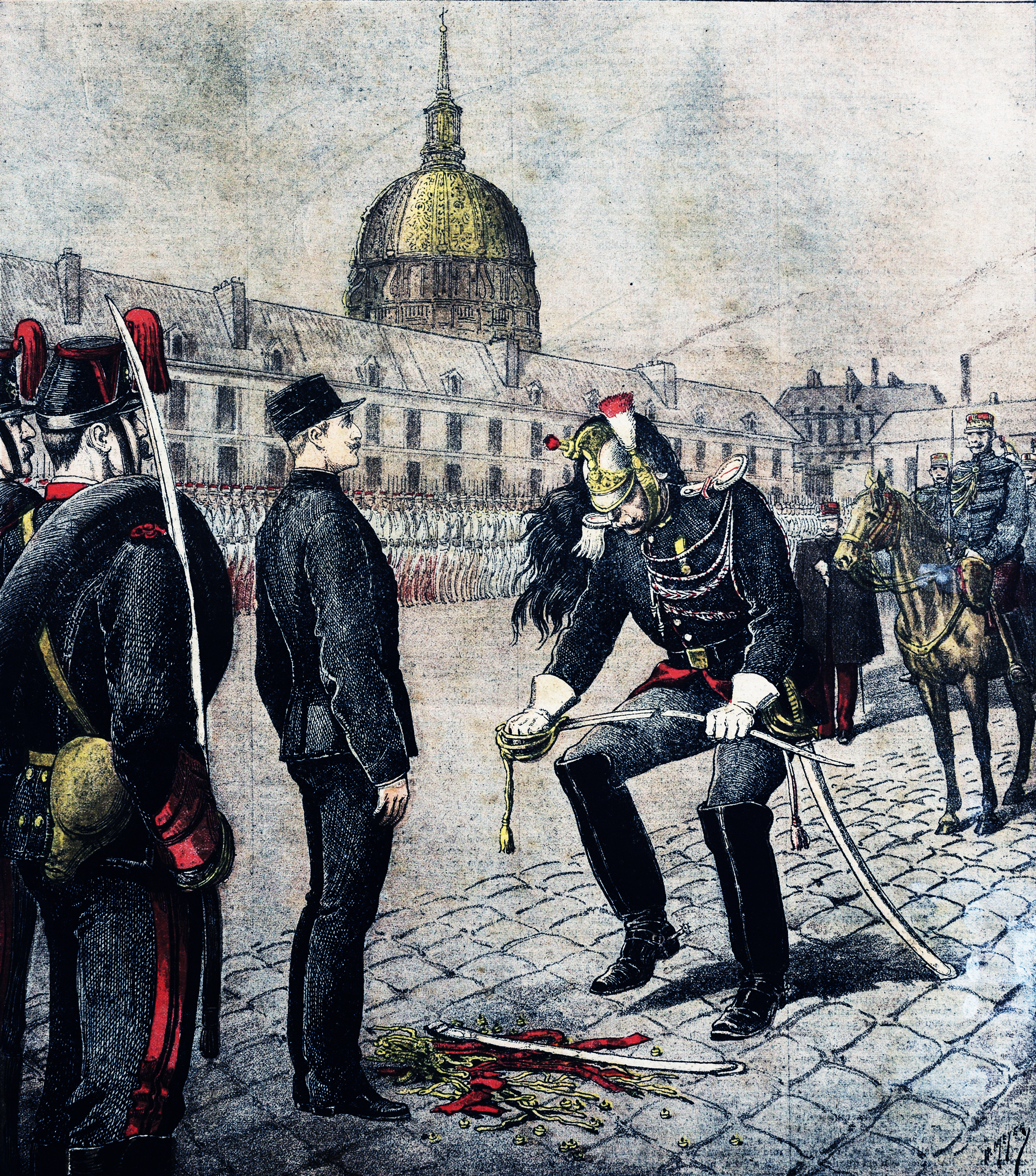
The cashiering of Alfred Dreyfus on 5 January 1895

Cashiering (or degradation ceremony), generally within military forces, is a ritual dismissal of an individual from some position of responsibility for a breach of discipline.

== Etymology ==
From the Flemish kasseren (to dismiss from service; to discard [troops]), the word entered the English language in the late 16th century, during the wars in the Low Countries.

== Military ==
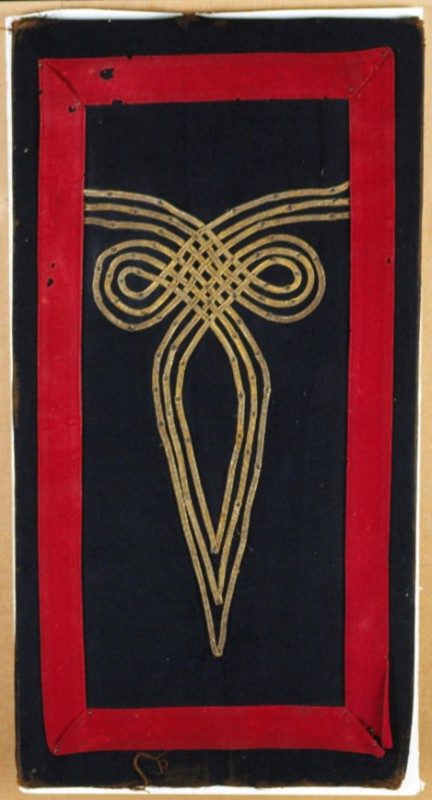
Austrian knot from the uniform of Alfred Dreyfus, kept in Paris's Musée d'Art et d'Histoire du Judaïsme

It is especially associated with the public degradation of disgraced military officers. Prior to World War I, this aspect of cashiering sometimes involved a parade-ground ceremony in front of assembled troops with the destruction of symbols of status: epaulettes ripped off shoulders, badges and insignia stripped, swords broken, caps knocked away, and medals torn off and dashed upon the ground.

In the era when British Army officers generally bought their commissions, being cashiered meant that the amount they had paid was lost, as they could not "sell-out" afterwards.

== Notable examples ==
Famous victims of cashiering include Francis Mitchell (1621), Thomas Cochrane, 10th Earl of Dundonald (after the Great Stock Exchange Fraud of 1814), Justus McKinstry, Alfred Dreyfus (1894, see trial and conviction of Alfred Dreyfus and Dreyfus affair), and Philippe Pétain (1945, stripped of all ranks and honors except Marshal of France).

William Calley, the sole person convicted of the My Lai Massacre, was cashiered out instead of receiving a punitive discharge.

Following the failure of the 1935 Greek coup d'état attempt, Lieutenant Colonel Christodoulos Tsigantes, his brother captain Ioannis Tsigantes, colonel Stefanos Sarafis and other participants of the coup were cashiered in a public ceremony.

While most closely associated with Captain Dreyfus, the ceremony of formal degradation (French: Dégradation militaire) occurred several times in the French military under the Third Republic. At least one other army officer and a naval officer were subjected to the ritual of having their swords broken and the insignia, braid and buttons publicly torn from their uniforms, after being found guilty of charges of treason. More commonly, a number of NCOs and private soldiers underwent similar punishments for committing various serious offenses, before execution or imprisonment.

The physical acts of ripping away insignia and breaking swords could be made easier by some prior preparation. A contemporary account in The New York Times of the Dreyfus cashiering in 1894 says:

To prepare for stripping the prisoner of his insignia of rank, the prison tailor yesterday removed all the buttons and stripes from Dreyfus' tunic, the red stripes from his trousers and the regimental number and braid from his collar and cap. These were all replaced with a single stitch so that they could be torn away readily. The condemned man's sword was also filed almost in two, in order that it might be easily broken. The Adjutant's quick movement and apparent effort in breaking the sword was consequently mere pretense, as only a mere touch was necessary.

In the 1964 film Mary Poppins, Mr Banks is cashiered when he is fired from the bank. This involved his flower carnation torn from his lapel, his umbrella being turned inside out and his bowler hat being punched through.

In the 1942 Bugs Bunny short, Fresh Hare, Bugs cashiers Elmer Fudd as a disgrace to the Mounties by tearing away not just his uniform and insignias, but also his undershorts.

== See also ==
- Branded (TV series)
- Defrocking
- Demotion
- Hazing
- Dishonorable discharge
- Drumming out (also "drubbing out" in some varieties of American English)
- Military discipline
- Political rehabilitation
- Reduction in rank
