= 336th Bomber Squadron =

- 336 Μοίρα Βομβαρδισμού
- The badge of 336 Bomber Sq.
- Active: 25 February 1943–
- Country: Greece
- Branch: Hellenic Air Force
- Role: Bomber
- Part of: 116th Combat Wing
- Garrison/HQ: Araxos Air Base
- Motto: fly low hit hard

The 336th Bomber Squadron (Greek: 336 Μοίρα Βομβαρδισμού, 336 MB), callsign "Olympus", is the second oldest squadron in service with the Hellenic Air Force, forming part of the 116th Combat Wing. It is based at Araxos Air Base in the Peloponnese, and operates the F-16 Block 52 Advanced aircraft.

== History ==
=== Foundation and service in World War II ===
After the fall of Greece to the German Wehrmacht, the Greek government in exile established Greek armed forces to fight alongside the Allies in the Middle East. By 1942, two Greek squadrons, the 13th Light Bomber Squadron and the 335th Fighter Squadron, were operating under British command. Their good service record and the existence of sufficient numbers of Greek pilots, newly graduated from aviation schools in Rhodesia, led to the establishment of a third squadron.

No. 336 (Greek) Squadron RAF
- The emblem of the 336 Squadron in World War II
- Active: 25 February 1943 – 31 July 1945
- Country: United Kingdom
- Allegiance: Greece
- Branch: Royal Air Force
- Role: Fighter squadron
- Part of: RAF Fighter Command
- Mottos: Αμύνεσθαι περί πάτρης ("Defend the Fatherland")

Insignia
- Squadron Badge heraldry: No official RAF badge awarded

The 336th Royal Hellenic Pursuit Squadron (336 Βασιλική Ελληνική Μοίρα Διώξεως, 336 Β.Ε.Μ.Δ.), designated within the British Royal Air Force as No 336 (Greek) Squadron, was established on 25 February 1943 at LG 219. Equipped with 21 Hurricane Mk IIc aircraft and under the command of Flight Lieutenant Spyridon Diamantopoulos, it counted many veteran pilots from 335 Squadron in its ranks. This allowed the unit to quickly begin operations: its first combat mission was carried out on 1 March, and the unit was declared operational on 11 April. It was subsequently employed in shipping protection and air defence duties along the Libyan coast, as well as fighter sweeps. The squadron received its first six Spitfire Mk Vc aircraft on 12 October, and over the month of November it participated in several Allied raids against Crete. Although successful, these missions involved great danger from the German air defence and the Luftwaffe, and resulted in several losses. By March 1944, the unit had been completely re-equipped with Spitfires, and on 15 September, the squadron was moved along with its sister unit to the Italian theatre, from where it carried out operations primarily over occupied Yugoslavia.

In November the Greek squadrons returned to liberated Greece, where they were engaged in operations from the Ellinikon airfield against the remaining German garrisons in the Aegean islands and Crete. In May 1945, the squadron moved to Sedes airfield near Thessaloniki, where, on 31 July 1945, the squadron was disbanded from the RAF and transferred to Greek control.

=== Post-war history ===
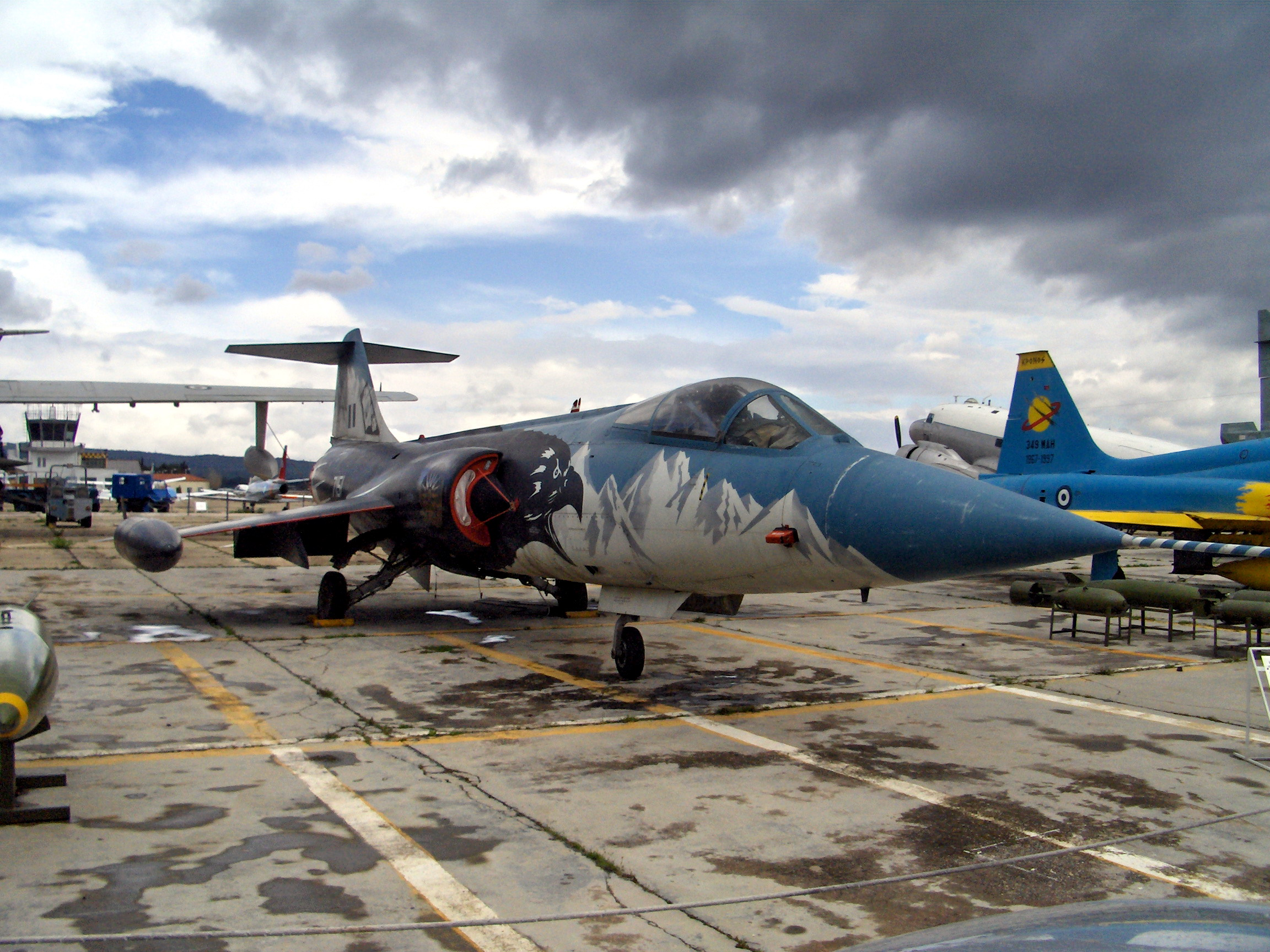
F-104G Starfighter painted in the special "Olympus" scheme for the type's decommissioning from 336 Squadron.

Subsequently, 336 Squadron took part in the air operations of the Greek Civil War (1946–49). In February 1949 it was rebased to Larissa under the 110th Combat Wing. In August, the squadron was equipped with the US-made Curtiss SB2C Helldiver dive bombers, being redesignated as the 336th Light Bomber Squadron (336 Μοίρα Ελαφρού Βομβαρδισμού). In 1953 it was equipped with Republic F-84 Thunderjets and redesignated 336th Fighter-Bomber Squadron (336 Μοίρα Διώξεως-Βομβαρδισμού). On 28 December 1953, the squadron was transferred to 111th Combat Wing at Nea Anchialos, where it received the new Republic F-84F Thunderstreak in 1958. Redeployed again to Larissa in March 1959, it was transferred to 116th Combat Wing in December 1962. On 25 September 1963 it was redesignated as a Strike Squadron (Μοίρα Κρούσης) as a reflection of its new role.

On 15 January 1965 the squadron was partially equipped with the new Lockheed F-104G Starfighter fighters, and the F-104 section moved to the 114th Combat Wing at Tanagra, while the remainder of the squadron, still equipped with the F-84F, remained at Araxos. In August, the F-84F-equipped section was designated as the 349 Fighter-Bomber Squadron, before being transferred to Larissa in November 1966. In December, the F-104G-equipped 336 Squadron returned from Tanagra to Araxos, where it remains to this day. The squadron would continue to fly the Starfighter until March 1993, following which the squadron was equipped with the Vought A-7E Corsair (from a batch of 62 handed over by the US Air Force as surplus following the First Gulf War), and established in its present form as the 336 Bomber Squadron on 3 April 1993. Since 2007 it was the last squadron in the world flying the A-7 Corsair II.

The A-7 was finally withdrawn from service on 17 October 2014, and replaced with the F-16 Block 52 Advanced.

Four F-16s from the squadron participated in Exercise Tarang Shakti Phase II of the Indian Air Force that was held from 30 August to 16 September 2024. The jets along with 2 Lockheed C-130 Hercules landed at Jodhpur airbase on 29 August 2024.
