= Sacred Squadron (Greece) =

- Ιερός Λόχος
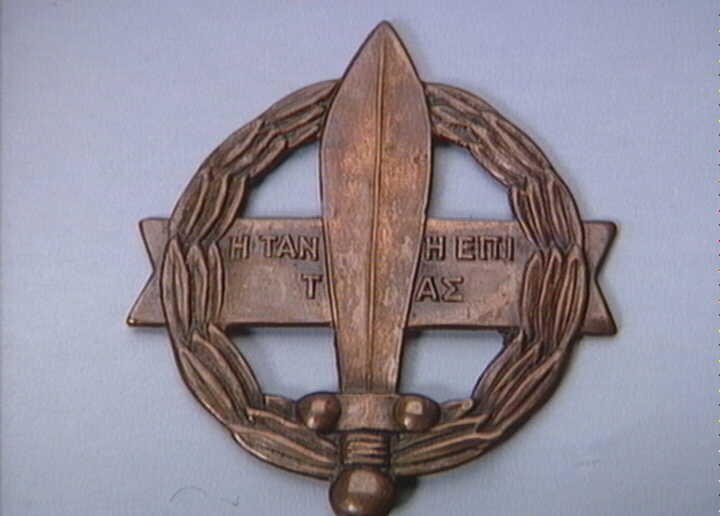
- Unit insignia
- Active: 1942–1945
- Country: Kingdom of Greece
- Allegiance: (Greece) Greek government-in-exile
- Branch: Hellenic Army
- Type: Special Forces
- Size: Battalion, later Regiment
- Engagements: World War II: Tunisia Campaign; Dodecanese Campaign; Raid on Symi; Greek Civil War: Dekemvriana
- Decorations: Commanders Cross of the Cross of Valour; War Cross First Class

Commanders
- Commander: Christodoulos Tsigantes; Andreas Kalinskis

The Sacred Squadron (Greek: Ιερός Λόχος) was a Greek special forces unit formed in 1942 in the Middle East, composed mostly of Greek officers and officer cadets under the command of Col. Christodoulos Tsigantes. It fought alongside the SAS in the Western Desert and the Aegean, as well as with General Leclerc's Free French Forces in Tunisia. It was disbanded in August 1945 but is the precursor to the modern Special Forces of the Hellenic Army.

== History ==
=== Establishment ===
Immediately after the German occupation of Greece in April–May 1941, the Greek government fled to Egypt and started to form military units in exile. The plethora of officers in relation to the number of ordinary soldiers, led Air Force Lt. Colonel G. Alexandris to suggest the creation of an Army unit, formed by officers, with soldier's duties. This suggestion was approved by the Commander of the II Greek Brigade, Infantry Colonel Alkiviadis Bourdaras. Therefore, according to reports they claimed to be Greek officers and later joined the original group of officers. Firemen were also reported in that group. Thus, in August 1942 the "Company of Chosen Immortals" (Greek: Λόχος Επιλέκτων Αθανάτων) was formed under Cavalry Major Antonios Stefanakis in Palestine, with 200 men. Initially, the unit was organized as a machine gun company and intended to be attached to the II Greek Brigade, then under formation.

However, on September 15, 1942, the unit's new commander, Colonel Tsigantes, renamed the unit to "Sacred Band" after the Sacred Band of Thebes and the Sacred Band of the Greek Revolution, and successfully applied for its conversion into a special forces unit. Greek Cypriots also took part in the Sacred Squadron.

=== SAS Squadron ===
In close cooperation with the commander of the British SAS Regiment, Lt. Colonel David Stirling, and with the approval of the Greek HQ, the company moved to the SAS base at Qabrit in Egypt to begin its training in its new role. However, following the Second Battle of El Alamein, the speed of the Allied advance across Libya brought an end to the era of jeep-borne raiding.

Nevertheless, this period provided a useful introduction to the SAS Regiment in general, and Major Jellicoe's squadron in particular. This squadron was being built upon the amphibious skills of the famous Commando unit, the Special Boat Section (SBS) and would become the Special Boat Squadron (SBS). With the end of the war in Africa, in May, the SAS split into two branches. The Special Raiding Squadron would serve in the central Mediterranean, before returning home to develop an airborne role, whilst the SBS would serve in the Aegean, operating alongside the Greek Sacred Squadron.

=== First actions in Tunisia ===
On 7 February 1943, following Colonel Tsigantes' suggestion, the Commander of the British 8th Army, General Bernard Montgomery, put the Greek company under the command of General Philippe Leclerc de Hauteclocque of the Free French with the duties of Light Mechanized Cavalry. On March 10, 1943, in the area of Ksar-Rillan in Tunisia, the Sacred Squadron gave its first battle against a German mechanized detachment, while covering the advance of the X British Army Corps that tried to by-pass the Mareth defence line from the South.

Immediately after the Allied forces captured the Tunisian city of Gabès, the Sacred Company was detailed to the 2nd New Zealand Division (29 March) and on 6 April a mixed Greek-New Zealand detachment fought against the Germans at Wadi Akarit. On 12 April the Sacred Squadron entered Sousse, and participated in the battle for Enfidaville between 13 and 17. April

=== Commando actions in the Aegean ===
From May 1943, the Sacred Squadron, now composed of 314 men, moved to Palestine, in various camps. In July, it went to Jenin for parachute training. There it also underwent a reorganization into an HQ Section, a Base Section, and Commando Sections I, II and III. After the Italian armistice on 9 September 1943, British forces moved into the Italian-occupied, but Greek-inhabited Dodecanese islands. Section I of the Sacred Squadron was dropped by air to the Greek island of Samos on 30 October, while sections II and III moved there on fishing boats. With the failure of the campaign after the battle of Leros, however, Samos was evacuated, and the men of the Sacred Squadron withdrew to the Middle East.

In February 1944, it was put under the command of the British Raiding Forces. On 7 February Section I moved for combat operations to the islands of the northern Aegean Sea (Samos, Psara, Lesvos, Chios), while Section II moved to the Dodecanese with the same purpose.

In April 1944, the Sacred Squadron was expanded to regimental size, with a strength of around 1,000 men. This reflected the unit's effectiveness, and, from a British standpoint, political reliability in the face of mounting political tensions among the Greek forces in exile. Along with the British SBS, the Sacred Squadron took part in the successful Raid on Symi in July 1944 in which the entire German garrison was either killed or captured.

=== The Dekemvriana, end of war and disbandment of the unit ===
After the Greek mainland was liberated (October 1944), the Sacred Squadron returned to Greece, where strains were becoming evident in the relationship of George Papandreou's British-backed national unity government and the leftist National Liberation Front (EAM), which controlled most of the Greek countryside. The crucial issue was the disarmament of the guerrilla forces and the formation of a new national army out of members of both the exiled armed forces and the guerrillas of ELAS and EDES. However, the Papandreou government wished to retain the Sacred Squadron and the 3rd Greek Rimini Mountain Brigade intact: faced with the far larger guerilla army of uncertain political intent, Papandreou and the British wished to keep these units and make them the core of the new army. Disbanding them would mean that their members would become individual recruits in a possibly EAM-dominated people's army. This tension eventually spilled over into the Dekemvriana events in Athens, where the Sacred Squadron fought against ELAS forces.

Throughout October 1944, and then again from February 1945, after the fighting in Athens had ended, the Sacred Squadron continued operating against the remaining German garrisons in the islands of the Aegean Sea until the war's end in May 1945. In July, the unit returned to Egypt prior to its disbandment, which took place in a ceremony in Athens, on 7 August 1945. During the ceremony the unit's flag was awarded with Greece's highest military awards, the Commander's Cross of the Cross of Valour and the War Cross First Class. The unit's casualties throughout its existence amounted to 25 dead, 56 wounded, 3 missing and 29 taken prisoner.

In the Hellenic Army, some of the Sacred Squadron's traditions are carried on by the Mountain Raiding Companies (LOK), founded at the end of 1946 and beginning of 1947.

== See also ==
- Walter Milner-Barry (officer of the Transjordan Frontier Force and SBS)
- Ian Lapraik (famous SBS and later 21 SAS officer)
- Wilfred Thesiger (officer of the Sudan Defence Force and, briefly the SAS, but best known as a desert explorer and author)
- Konstantinos Korkas (Greek general and was the last surviving member of the Sacred Squadron)

== Bibliography ==
- The Sacred Squadron The struggles of an elite military unit from the deserts of Africa to the islands of the Aegean during WW2
- The Greek Sacred Squadron
- The complete operational history of the Sacred Band
