= Christodoulos Tsigantes =

Greek general

- Χριστόδουλος Τσιγάντες
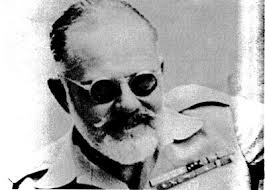
- Christodoulos Tsigantes
- Born: January 30, 1897; Tulcea, Romania
- Died: October 12, 1970 (aged 73); London, United Kingdom
- Education: Phanar Greek Orthodox College; Hellenic Military Academy; French school of war
- Spouse: Maria Drakouli (m. 1921)
- Children: 2
- Relatives: Ioannis Tsigantes (Brother)
- Military career
- Branch: Hellenic Army
- Service years: 1916–1935; 1940–1948
- Rank: Major General
- Unit: National Defence Army Corps: Serres Division; French Foreign Legion
- Commands: Sacred Band
- Conflicts: World War I: Macedonian front; Battle of Skra-di-Legen; Russian Civil War: White movement; Greco-Turkish War (1919–1922); World War II: Western Desert campaign; Tunisian campaign; Dodecanese campaign
- Other work: Article writer/ commentator

Christodoulos Tsigantes (Greek: Χριστόδουλος Τσιγάντες; 30 January 1897 – October 11, 1970) was a Greek general who distinguished himself as the commander of the Sacred Band during the Second World War. He was born in Tulcea, Romania, to Greek parents of Kefalonian origin and died in London, where he was cremated.

Following the failure of the 1935 Greek coup d'état attempt Lieutenant Colonel Christodoulos Tsigantes, his brother Captain Ioannis Tsigantes, Colonel Stefanos Sarafis and other participants of the coup were cashiered in a public ceremony.

== Military career ==
=== 1913–1915 period ===
After his graduation, he returned to Athens and entered the Evelpidon Military Academy from which he graduated in 1916 with the rank of Second Lieutenant of Infantry.

As soon as he left the School, he took part in the pro-Venizelos National Defense Movement in 1916 and fought on the Macedonian Front (1917–18) against the Germans and Bulgarians during the First World War. Subsequently, he took part in the Greek military mission in the Crimea in the context of the Russian Civil War, as well as in the Asia Minor Campaign as a Captain.

On January 17, 1921, he married Maria Drakoulis, a native of Ithaca but a permanent resident of Romania, with whom he later had two boys, Gerasimos in 1924 and Eleftherios in 1935.

On December 15, 1923, he was promoted to the rank of Major and then studied at the French War School in Paris and upon his return to Greece served in various staff positions.

In 1934 he was promoted to the rank of Lieutenant Colonel.

=== 1935 coup attempt ===
He took part, as a main member of the secret revolutionary "Hellenic Military Organization" (1933-1935), in the Venice movement of March 1, 1935. After the failure of the movement, he was arrested and tried, on March 31, 1935, by the Extraordinary Military Court of Athens on high treason along with other Venizelian officers. He was sentenced to life imprisonment with the consequent penalty of military demotion, to a common soldier, held publicly on April 2, 1935 in the then infantry barracks (today's Liberty Park).

However, after the restoration, King George II granted him a pardon, which stopped the further serving of the sentence.

=== World War II ===
From 1940 to 1941 he served in the French Foreign Legion in Libya and Eritrea.

In 1942, after appearing before the exiled Greek government in Cairo, he was recalled to the ranks of the Hellenic Army.

During the period September 15, 1942 - August 7, 1945, he assumed command of the Sacred Band, taking part both in the operations of Libya and Tunis, as well as the Dodecanese.

=== After World War II ===
With the end of the war, in 1945, he assumed military command of the Archipelagos and, until 1947, head of the Greek Military Mission to the Dodecanese, preparing their integration into the Greek state where that period he was promoted to the rank of Brigadier General.

Finally, he assumed military command of Evia, where he was retired at his request, on May 1, 1948, receiving the rank of Major General.

He was honored with many decorations, Greek and allied, as well as by kings George II and Paul.

== Later life ==
After his retirement he was a columnist and commentator for various centrist newspapers (The Nation, Ta Nea, Eleftheria).

In 1950, he was appointed general manager of the (then) National Radio Foundation (EIR, later Hellenic Broadcasting Corporation) at the suggestion of the vice-president of the government, Georgios Papandreou. He remained in this position until early 1953, when he was replaced by the Papagos government.

Also in the parliamentary elections of 1950, 1956 and 1958, he ran as a candidate with the Liberal Party, but without success.

In 1970 he fell seriously ill and was taken to London where he died on October 12, 1970 and his body was cremated in the British capital.
