= 335th Squadron (HAF) =

- 335 Μοίρα
- The badge of 335 Sq.
- Active: 7 October 1941–Present
- Country: Greece
- Branch: Hellenic Air Force
- Role: Multirole
- Part of: 116th Combat Wing
- Garrison/HQ: Araxos Air Base

Aircraft flown
- Bomber: F-16 Block 52+

The 335th Squadron (Greek: 335 Μοίρα, 335 M), callsign "Tigers", is the oldest squadron in service with the Hellenic Air Force formed on the 10th of October 1941 at Aqir airfield in Palestine as a unit in exile. It is based at Araxos Air Base in the Peloponnese, forming part of the 116th Combat Wing. Until March 2008, the squadron was equipped with the A-7H Corsair, and is operating with 30 newly purchased F-16 Block 52+ aircraft.

During World War II it served under the Royal Air Force as a unit in exile operating in the middle east. Participating in convoy protection, bomber escort, and ground attack roles. Significant battles which the squadron was involved with include the Second Battle of El Alamein, and the Italian campaign. In November the Greek squadrons returned to liberated Greece, where they were engaged in operations against the remaining German garrisons in the Aegean islands and Crete. On 31 July 1945, the squadron was disbanded from the RAF and transferred to Greek control. The motto of the 335th Squadron: Αίεν Υψικρατείν ("Always dominate the Heights") is now the official motto of the Hellenic Air Force.

Following the hand-over, the squadron was deployed to Sedes Air Base near Thessaloniki. From there, after the outbreak of the Greek Civil War, the squadron participated in operations against the Communist guerrillas with Spitfire Mk Vbs and a small number of captured Messerschmitt Bf 109 G-6s. In June 1947 it was equipped with Spitfires Mk IX and XVI, which were retained until October 1953, when the squadron, now based at Elefsis, was equipped with jet aircraft: the US-made F-84 Thunderjet fighter-bombers and RT-33A reconnaissance aircraft. On 3 April 1993, the squadron was established as the 335th Bomber Squadron (335 Μοίρα Βομβαρδισμού), flying the A-7H Corsair, from a batch of 62 aircraft handed over by the US Air Force as surplus following the First Gulf War. The squadron operated the aircraft until 2008, when it began receiving new F-16 Block 52+ Advanced aircraft. Converted to a multirole squadron, it became operational with the type in February 2010.

== History ==
=== Foundation and World War II ===
No. 335 (Greek) Squadron RAF
- The unofficial Squadron Badge of No. 335 (Greek) Squadron RAF
- Active: 10 October 1941 – 31 July 1945
- Country: Greece
- Allegiance: Greece
- Branch: Royal Air Force
- Role: Fighter squadron
- Part of: RAF Fighter Command
- Mottos: Αίεν Υψικρατείν ("Always dominate the Heights")

Insignia
- Squadron Code: FG (Oct 1941 – Jul 1946)

In April 1941, the German Wehrmacht overran Greece. The Greek government under King George II fled to Allied-controlled Egypt, where it began to establish expatriate Greek Armed Forces. These were formed out of personnel that had been evacuated from Greece or fled to the Middle East during the Occupation, and were equipped and organised along British lines, coming under British command. They had also been formed from Greeks who migrated to Egypt or were born in Egypt before the War.

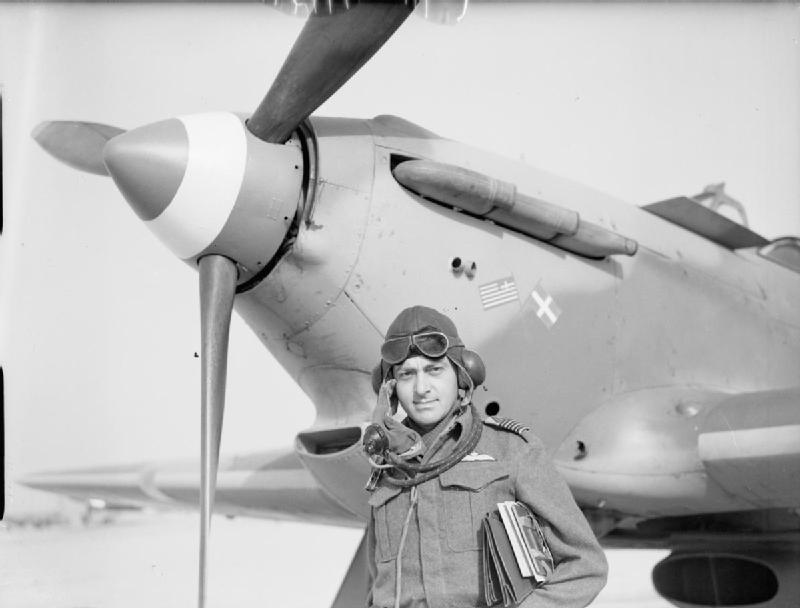
Major Xenophon Varvaresos, Commanding Officer of the squadron, in front of a Hawker Hurricane Mark I at Aqir, Palestine

Members of the squadron celebrating the successful bombing of the Italian XX Corps headquarters, Oct. 28, 1942.

The squadron was formed as the 335th Royal Hellenic Pursuit Squadron (335 Βασιλική Ελληνική Μοίρα Διώξεως, 335 Β.Ε.Μ.Δ.), designated within the British Royal Air Force as No 335 (Greek) Squadron, on 10 October 1941 at Aqir airfield in Palestine. Its first commander was Squadron Leader Xenophon Varvaressos, and the personnel was provided from a core of Greek pilots who were undergoing training in Iraq, augmented by others who had fled from Greece. Initially it was equipped with Hurricane Mk I aircraft, and employed while training in defensive duties until January 1942. Subsequently, the squadron was transferred to El Daba in Egypt, where it was declared as fully operational on 12 February 1942. The squadron began operations over the Western Desert, where it operated continuously until late 1942, participating in convoy protection, bomber escort and ground attack roles. Between June and September 1942, it was re-equipped with Hurricane IIBs. Under Squadron Leader Ioannis Kellas, the squadron participated in the air operations of the Second Battle of El Alamein; on 28 October 1942, the second anniversary of the Italian invasion of Greece, the squadron organized a strafing attack on the Italian XX Corps headquarters, an operation that was a huge morale booster for the expatriate Greeks.

In the aftermath of the Allied victory, the squadron returned to shipping protection duties, while being outfitted with the newer Spitfire Mk Vb and Vc aircraft from December 1943 onwards. On 15 September, the squadron was moved along with its sister unit to the Italian theatre, from where it carried out operations primarily over occupied Yugoslavia.

In November the Greek squadrons returned to liberated Greece, where they were engaged in operations against the remaining German garrisons in the Aegean islands and Crete. On 31 July 1945, the squadron was disbanded from the RAF and transferred to Greek control. The motto of the 335 Squadron Αίεν Υψικρατείν ("Always dominate the Heights") is now the official motto of the Hellenic Air Force.

=== Post–war history ===
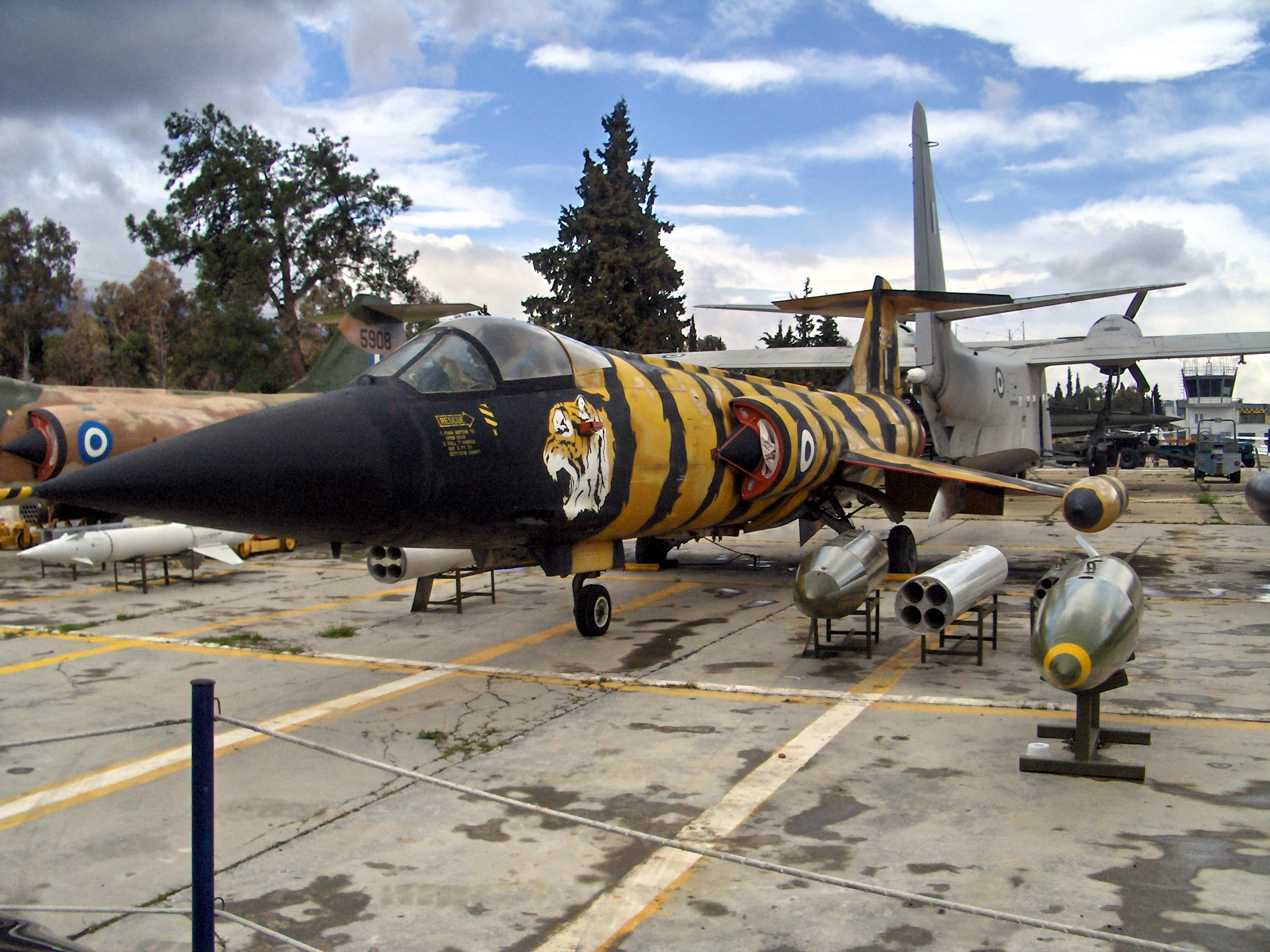
F-104G Starfighter painted in the special "Tiger" scheme for the type's decommissioning from 335 Squadron.

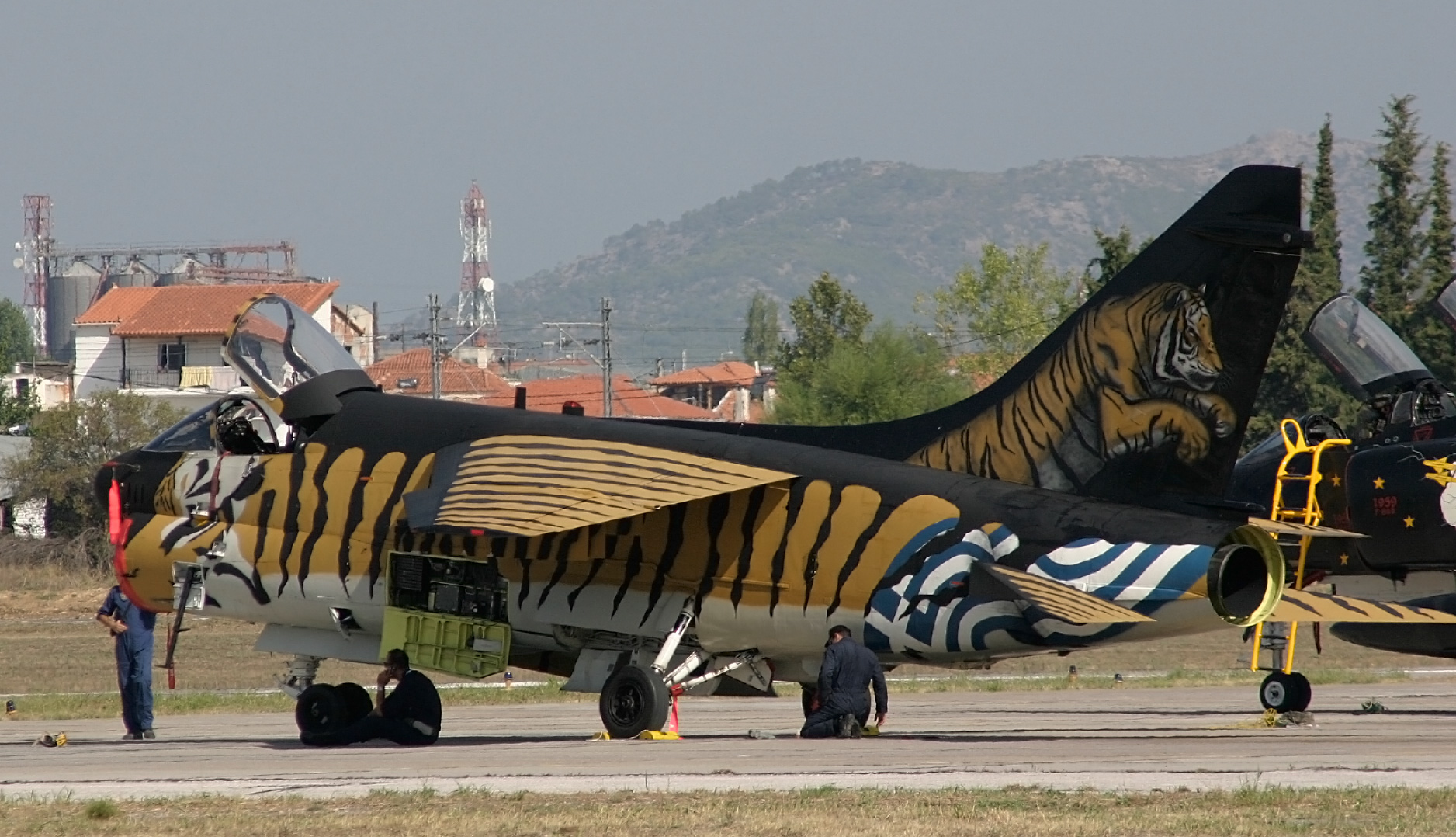
335 Sq. A-7E Corsair II painted in a special "Tiger" scheme at the "Archangel" Air Show, 2005.

Following the hand-over, the squadron was deployed to Sedes Air Base near Thessaloniki. From there, after the outbreak of the Greek Civil War, the squadron participated in operations against the Communist guerrillas. In June 1947 it was equipped with Spitfires Mk IX and XVI, which were retained until October 1953, when the squadron, now based at Elefsis, was equipped with jet aircraft: the US-made F-84 Thunderjet fighter-bombers and RT-33A reconnaissance aircraft. The redesignated 335th Fighter-Bomber Squadron (335 Μοίρα Διώξεως-Βομβαρδισμού) came under the 111th Combat Wing at Nea Anchialos until September 1957, when it redeployed to 110th Combat Wing at Larissa, where it was equipped with F-84F jets.

In November 1960, the squadron was transferred to Tanagra and assigned to ground strike duties as the 335th Strike Squadron (335 Μοίρα Κρούσης), where it remained until its transfer to Araxos in June 1977. In May 1965 the squadron was equipped with the F-104G, and would continue flying the Starfighters until May 1992. In December 1987 the squadron received 10 RF-104 aircraft and formed a separate Photoreconnaissance Flight. These aircraft remained in service until the type was decommissioned in May 1992.

On 3 April 1993, the squadron was established as the 335th Bomber Squadron (335 Μοίρα Βομβαρδισμού), flying the A-7H Corsair, from a batch of 62 aircraft handed over by the US Air Force as surplus following the First Gulf War. The squadron operated the aircraft until 2008, when it began receiving new F-16 Block 52+ Advanced aircraft. Converted to a multirole squadron, it became operational with the type in February 2010.

== See also ==
- 336th Bomber Squadron (HAF)
