= Foggin =

Foggin is a surname. Notable people with the surname include:

- Chris Foggin (born 1985), British film director and screenwriter
- Dave Foggin, member of the West Virginia House of Delegates
- Myers Foggin (1908–1986), British concert pianist and conductor
