= Kridener =

Kridener is a surname. Notable people with the surname include:

- Nikolay Kridener (1811-1891), Baltic German infantry general
- Pavel Kridener (1784-1858), Russian diplomat
