= Battle of Nikopol =

1877 battle of the Russo-Turkish War (1877–1878)

- Part of the Russo-Turkish War (1877–1878)
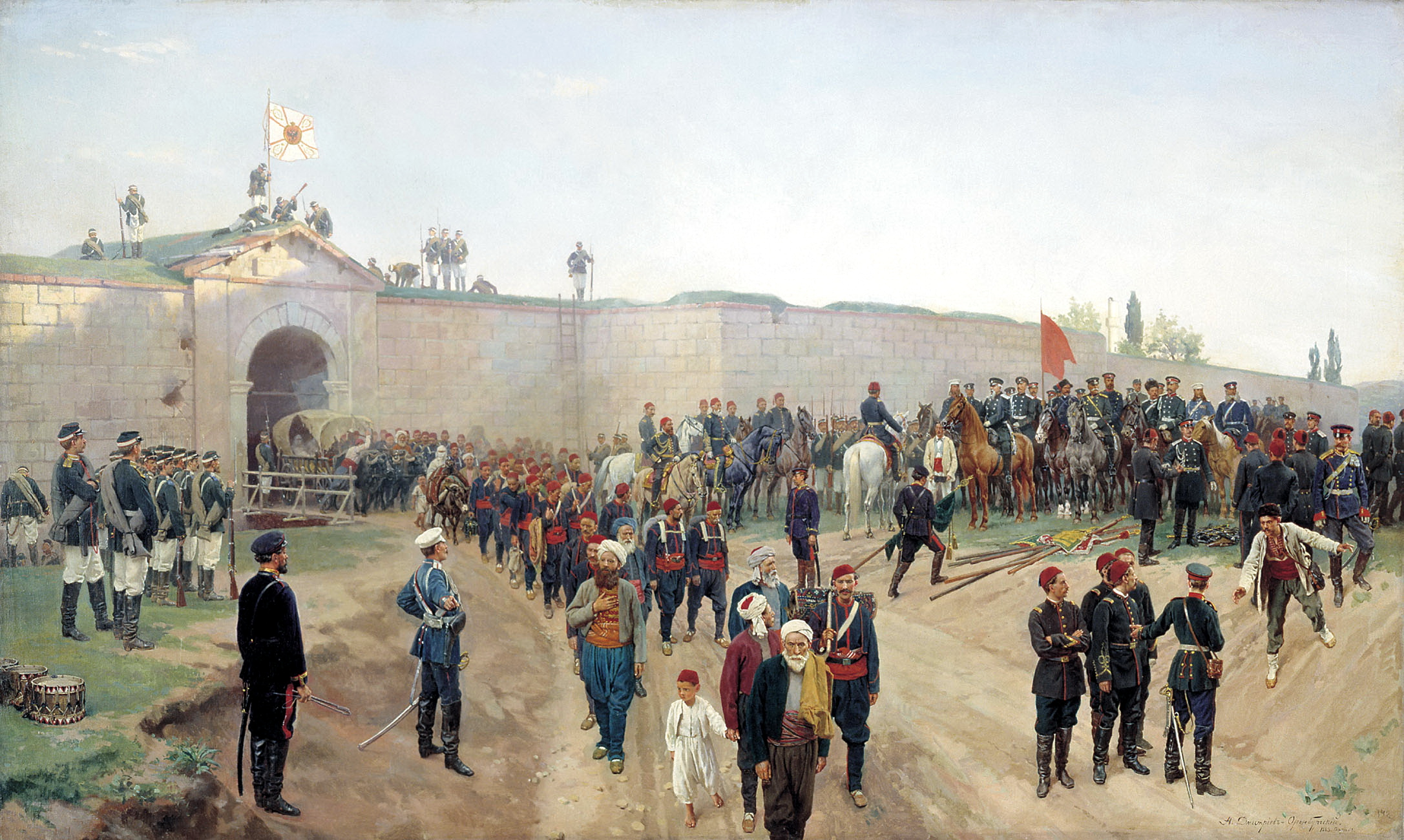
- Ottoman capitulation at Nikopol, Nikolai Dmitriev-Orenburgsky, 1883
Date	16 July 1877
Location	Niğbolu District, Rusçuk Sanjak, Tuna Province, Ottoman Empire (today Nikopol, Bulgaria) 43°42′N 24°53′E
Result	Russian victory

Belligerents
Russian Empire	Ottoman Empire

Commanders and leaders
Nikolay Kridener	Osman Pasha; Hasan Pasha

Strength
20,000	7,000

Casualties and losses
276 killed 949 wounded 84 missing	7,000 prisoners

The Battle of Nikopol, or Nicopolis (Turkish: Niğbolu Muharebesi), was one of the early battles of the Russo-Turkish War (1877–1878). As the Russian army crossed the Danube river, they approached the fortified city of Nikopol (Nicopolis). The Turkish high command sent Osman Pasha with the troops from Vidin to oppose the Russians' crossing of the Danube. Osman's intentions were to reinforce and defend Nikopol. However, General Nikolai Kridener's Russian IX Corps arrived first, bombarding and compelling the garrison's surrender before Osman Pasha could reach the city. He instead fell back to Plevna. With the Nikopol garrison eliminated, the Russians were free to march on to Plevna.

== See also ==
- Battles of the Russo-Turkish War (1877–1878)
- Siege of Plevna
- Battle of Nicopolis
