= Frank St. Leger =

Conductor

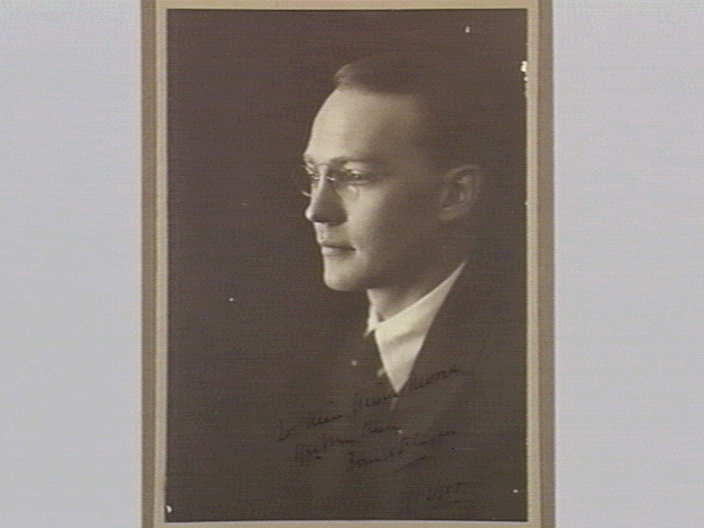
- Portrait Frank St. Leger, 1917
- Born: 30 May 1890
- Died: 26 December 1969 (aged 79)

Douglas Francis Warham "Frank" St. Leger (30 May 1890 – 26 December 1969) was a British-American conductor of Indian birth. During the 1930s he served three seasons as music director of the Houston Symphony Orchestra.

== Biography ==
St. Leger was born in Madras, now Chennai, India, to British parents. At 16, he entered the Royal Academy of Music in London, where he studied piano and conducting. He was graduated with several honors.

=== Career ===
Between 1912 and 1914, St. Leger toured as the pianist for the Cherniavsky Trio. He served in the Australian army for two years, following which he was appointed the pianist and conductor for the opera singer Dame Nellie Melba. His position with Melba brought St. Leger to the United States in 1917. As an accompanist, St. Leger recorded dozens of Russian songs on Vocalion with the Russian tenor Vladimir Rosing in the early 1920s.

Subsequently, he held positions with the American Opera Company, the Royal Opera at Covent Garden in London, and, beginning in 1929, a staff position with the Civic Opera of Chicago. In 1932 St. Leger was engaged as the music director of the Houston Symphony. He resigned following the season of 1934–1935. Following a position directing the Central City Opera in Colorado, St. Leger accepted, in 1939, a position as an assistant conductor for the Metropolitan Opera in New York City. He remained at the Metropolitan for the following eleven years, holding subsequent positions as regular conductor, musical secretary, and company assistant manager in charge of repertory.

St. Leger departed New York in 1950, and in 1953 joined the music faculty of Indiana University as professor of music. Upon his retirement in 1963, he was designated emeritus professor of music; after his retirement from full-time status at Indiana, he continued there part-time, coaching voice and opera.

=== Personal ===
On 10 February 1930, St. Leger married Katharine Elizabeth Millspaugh (1904–1968) in New York. They were the parents of a son, Frances William Hugh (1937–2021). St. Leger died in Bloomington, Indiana, at the age of 79.
