= Julian Herbage =

Julian Livingstone Herbage (10 September 1904 – 15 January 1976) was a British musicologist, broadcaster and member of the BBC music department. He is known for his scholarly edition of the score of Handel's Messiah (1935), for his role in planning the Proms from 1945 to 1961, and for editing and presenting the weekly BBC programme Music Magazine from 1944 to 1973.

== Life and career ==
Herbage was born in Woking, Surrey, the son of Walter Herbage, an official of Barclays Bank, and his wife Ruth Ann, née Livingston. He was educated at the Royal Naval Colleges at Osborne and Dartmouth, after which he went to St John's College, Cambridge as a choral student. From 1923 to 1927 he worked in the theatre. For the Everyman Theatre, Hampstead, in 1923 he arranged and conducted Thomas Arne's ballad opera Love in a Village. The following year he became conductor and composer of incidental music at the Savoy Theatre, and in 1925 he was employed by the Liverpool Repertory Company. The turning point in his career came in 1927, when his father recommended him to Sir John Reith, director general of the newly constituted British Broadcasting Corporation (BBC). After a few months working as an assistant of the BBC's London station, Herbage joined the staff of the music department, under the corporation's director of music, Percy Pitt.

At the BBC, Herbage's role steadily increased in importance; he became known as the corporation's musicologist, unearthing forgotten manuscripts, correcting corrupt editions of scores and arranging period music for broadcast. For a broadcast of As You Like It in 1932 his arrangement of 17th-century music for viols, recorder and lute was praised in the press for its intelligence and beauty. In 1935, for the 250th anniversary of Handel's birth, he prepared a scholarly performing edition of Messiah based on a manuscript score given by the composer to the Foundling Hospital. The performance, conducted by Adrian Boult, Pitt's successor as director of music and also the founding conductor of the BBC Symphony Orchestra, was a landmark in authentic performance style in Handel's music. Herbage was a member of the Royal Philharmonic Society's management committee, from 1940 until 1971.

From 1940 to 1944 Herbage was Boult's second-in-command as assistant director of music, but he found himself better suited to building programmes than to being an administrator, and in 1944 he dropped his managerial role and returned to detailed programme planning. In 1946 he resigned from the full-time staff of the BBC, though remaining closely associated with the corporation as a freelance for the rest of his career. In that year he married a fellow-member of the music department, Anna Instone, daughter of Sir Samuel Instone. They became joint editors of the long-running weekly radio programme Music Magazine, which ran from 1944 to 1973. Herbage was the presenter throughout the run of 1,155 editions.

As the end of the Second World War approached, and with Sir Henry Wood, the founding figure of the Proms dead, the BBC set up a committee to consider the future running of the concerts. Herbage was a member, and was charged with ensuring that the Proms were equally satisfactory as live concerts and as broadcasts. He discussed with the BBC programme planners what their needs were and then constructed programmes that would also appeal to audiences at the venue of the Proms, the Royal Albert Hall. William Glock, the BBC's controller of music, took on the planning of the Proms from 1960, and the last season planned by Herbage was that of 1961.

Herbage published books on Bax, Sibelius and Baroque Music; he wrote sleeve notes for a number of recordings. He appeared as a castaway on the BBC Radio programme Desert Island Discs on 17 May 1965.

Herbage died at the age of 71. Instone survived him by two years. His papers, including his research notes on Arne and autograph and copyist's manuscripts by E. J. Moeran, are in the collection of the Britten-Pears Foundation.
