= Nadine Conner =

American opera singer (1907–2003)

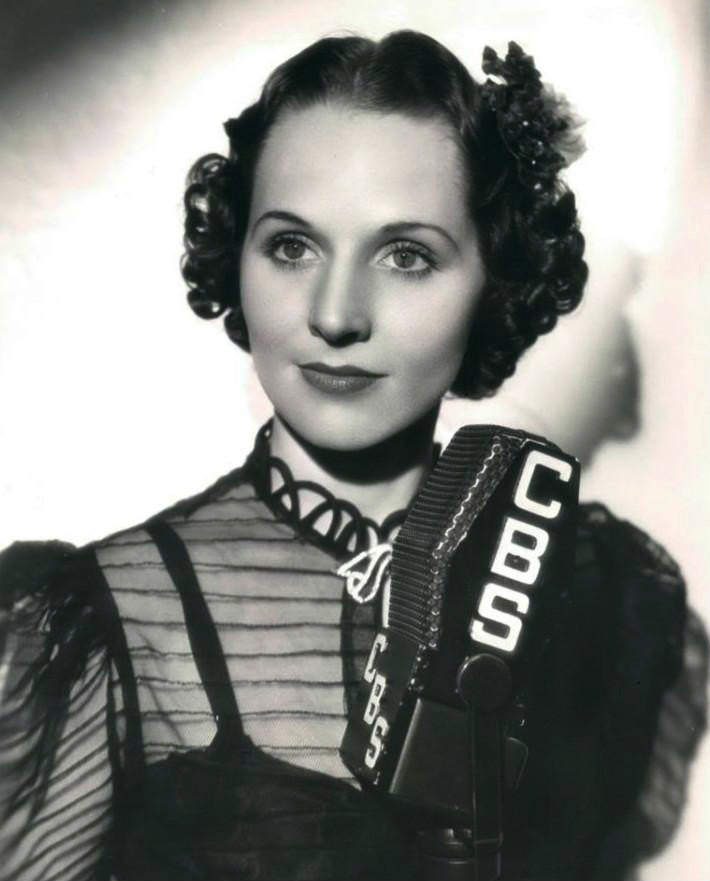
- Conner in 1937
- Born: Evelyn Nadine Henderson; February 20, 1907; Compton, California, U.S.
- Died: March 1, 2003 (aged 96); Los Angeles, California, U.S.
- Other name: Olga Bagdonova
- Education: University of California
- Occupation: Singer
- Spouse(s): ____ Conner (? - ?); Dr. Laurance Heacock (1939 - 1988, his death)
- Children: 1 daughter 1 son

Nadine Conner (born Evelyn Nadine Henderson; February 20, 1907 – March 1, 2003) was an American operatic soprano, radio singer and music teacher.

== Early years ==
She was born in Compton, California, as Evelyn Nadine Henderson, and was the descendant of some of the earliest non-Hispanic settlers in California.

Conner had six siblings, and all seven children sang. The family lived on a farm outside of Los Angeles, California. Her parents built their own theater, staging a variety of shows.

Diagnosed as a teenager with pulmonary disease, her doctor suggested she try studying classical singing to strengthen her lungs, as was customary at the time. Following his instructions, she began studying privately with Hollywood-based tenor, Amado Fernandez, during high school. In a fluke of fate, a great voice and singing talent emerged. Her natural potential revealed, she went on to study more seriously with Horatio Cogswell, and later in New York City with Florence Easton.

Conner attended Compton High School in Compton, California, and studied music at the University of California (another source says the University of Southern California), where she was active in the Glee Club.

== Career ==
Conner's radio debut came in 1933. After passing an audition, she was given a role on California Melodies. Her initial role on radio was being a soloist on staff at a Los Angeles station. Her work day began at 7 a.m. and sometimes ended late at night. She said, "I sang under four different names so listeners wouldn't get the idea we had only one soloist."

On radio, she was the featured singer on Shell Chateau and was a member of the cast of Showboat. She also appeared on The Voice of Firestone and with stars such as Bing Crosby and Nelson Eddy. She did a musical tour with Gordon MacRae.

But by the end of 1939, she was embarking on a career in classical opera. She made her professional debut in 1940 as Marguerite in Vladimir Rosing's Los Angeles production of Gounod's Faust. She sang with the Los Angeles Opera from 1939 to 1941. In 1941, she began her career at the Metropolitan Opera, making her debut as Pamina in The Magic Flute (sung in English).

Using the name Olga Bagdonova, Conner sang for more than a year and a half with a Russian musical group.

In 1949, she appeared in a Camel commercial, which shows her smoking in her dressing room just after the 10-minute call: "They're mild and they agree with my throat." She was featured in similar advertising in print media, such as an ad in Life magazine's May 22, 1950, issue.

She made numerous guest appearance in European opera houses, starting in 1953 and was also heard in a wide range of concert repertoire. She made a notable recording of the Brahms Ein deutsches Requiem with conductor Bruno Walter.

Connere became an acclaimed performer, excelling not only in Mozart, but gathering acclaim for her interpretation of Mimi in La Boheme, and an especially thrilling Violetta in La Traviata. She was comfortable in both lyric and coloratura roles. In all, she performed 249 times at the Met, retiring in 1960. She recorded with CBS, Cetra, Melodram, Discocorp, and Camden.

== Personal life ==
While studying music at the University of Southern California in Los Angeles, she was married to a classmate for two years. His last name was Conner, whose surname she adopted as her professional name. She later remarried in 1939 to Dr. Laurance Heacock, a surgeon, with whom she moved to Southern California in 1970. They had two children, a daughter, Sue Lynn, and a son, Loren. They later settled in Cypress, California, where she taught singing. They were still married when he died in 1988.

== Death ==
She died in Los Angeles on March 1, 2003. Her New York Times obituary gave her year of birth as 1907 and her age at death as 96, as did other sources, most notably, Variety. Some sources have since incorrectly cited 1913 or 1914 as her year of birth. Widowed since 1987, Nadine Conner was survived by her two children, four grandchildren, and three great-grandchildren.
