= Adrian Boult =

English conductor (1889–1983)

External audio
- Shellac recordings with Adrian Boult in the Online Archive of the Österreichische Mediathek

Sir Adrian Cedric Boult, CH (/boʊlt/; 8 April 1889 – 22 February 1983) was an English conductor. Brought up in a prosperous mercantile family, he followed musical studies in England and at Leipzig, Germany, with early conducting work in London for the Royal Opera House and Sergei Diaghilev's ballet company. His first prominent post was conductor of the City of Birmingham Orchestra in 1924. When the British Broadcasting Corporation appointed him director of music in 1930, he established the BBC Symphony Orchestra and became its chief conductor. The orchestra set standards of excellence that were rivalled in Britain only by the London Philharmonic Orchestra (LPO), founded two years later.

Forced to leave the BBC in 1950 on reaching retirement age, took on the chief conductorship of the LPO. The orchestra had declined from its peak of the 1930s, but under his guidance its fortunes were revived. He retired as its chief conductor in 1957, and later accepted the post of president. Although in the latter part of his career he worked with other orchestras, including the London Symphony Orchestra, the Philharmonia Orchestra, the Royal Philharmonic Orchestra, and his former orchestra, the BBC Symphony, it was the LPO with which he was primarily associated, conducting it in concerts and recordings until 1978, in what was widely called his "Indian summer".

Boult was known for his championing of British music. He gave the first performance of his friend Gustav Holst's The Planets, and introduced new works by, among others, Elgar, Bliss, Britten, Delius, Rootham, Tippett, Vaughan Williams and Walton. In his BBC years, he introduced works by foreign composers, including Bartók, Berg, Stravinsky, Schoenberg and Webern. A modest man who disliked the limelight, Boult felt as comfortable in the recording studio as on the concert platform, making recordings throughout his career. From the mid-1960s until his retirement after his last sessions in 1978 he recorded extensively for EMI. In addition to recordings that have remained in the catalogue, Boult's legacy includes his influence on prominent conductors of later generations, including Colin Davis and Vernon Handley.

== Biography ==
=== Early life ===
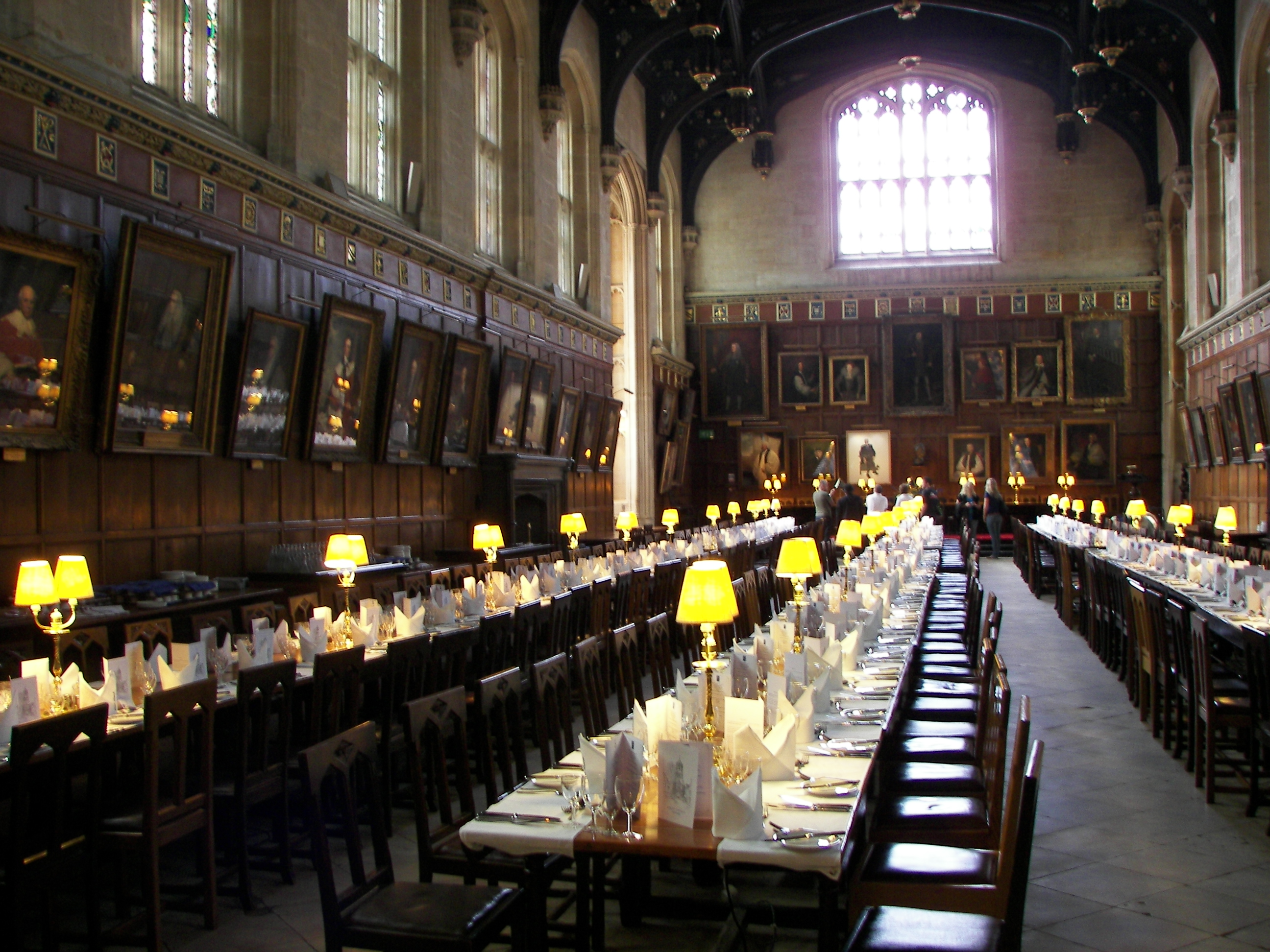
Christ Church, Oxford, where Boult was an undergraduate 1908–12

Boult was born in Chester, Cheshire, the second child and only son of Cedric Randal Boult (1853–1950), and his wife, Katharine Florence (née Barman; d. 1927). Cedric Boult was a Justice of the Peace and a successful businessman connected with Liverpool shipping and the oil trade; Cedric and his family had "a Liberal Unitarian outlook on public affairs" with a history of philanthropy.

When Boult was two years old the family moved to Blundellsands, where he was given a musical upbringing. From an early age he attended concerts in Liverpool, conducted mostly by Hans Richter. He was educated at Westminster School in London, where in his free time he attended concerts conducted by, among others, Sir Henry Wood, Claude Debussy, Arthur Nikisch, Fritz Steinbach, and Richard Strauss. His biographer, Michael Kennedy, writes, "Few schoolboys can have attended as many performances by great artists as Boult heard between 1901 and October 1908, when he went up to Christ Church, Oxford." While still a schoolboy, Boult met the composer Edward Elgar through Frank Schuster, a family friend.

At Christ Church college at Oxford, where he was an undergraduate from 1908 to 1912, Boult studied history but later switched to music, in which his mentor was the musical academic and conductor Hugh Allen. Among the musical friends he made at Oxford was Ralph Vaughan Williams, who became a lifelong friend.

In 1909 Boult presented a paper to an Oxford musical group, the Oriana Society, entitled Some Notes on Performance, in which he laid down three precepts for an ideal performance: observance of the composer's wishes, clarity through emphasis on balance and structure, and the effect of music made without apparent effort. These guiding principles lasted throughout his career. He was president of the University Musical Club for the year 1910, but his interests were not wholly confined to music: he was a keen rower, stroking his college boat at Henley, and all his life he remained a member of the Leander Club.

Boult graduated in 1912, with a basic "pass" degree. He continued his musical education at the Leipzig Conservatory in 1912–13. Hans Sitt was in charge of the conducting class, but Boult's main influence was Nikisch. He later recalled, "I went to all his [Nikisch's] rehearsals and concerts in the Gewandhaus. ... He had an astonishing baton technique and great command of the orchestra: everything was indicated with absolute precision. But there were others who were greater interpreters." Boult admired Nikisch "not so much for his musicianship but his amazing power of saying what he wanted with a bit of wood. He spoke very little". This style was in accord with Boult's opinion that "all conductors should be clad in an invisible Tarnhelm which makes it possible to enjoy the music without seeing any of the antics that go on". He sang in choral festivals and at the Leeds Festival of 1913, where he watched Nikisch conduct. There he made the acquaintance of George Butterworth, and other British composers. Later that year Boult joined the musical staff of the Royal Opera House, Covent Garden, where his most important work was to assist with the first British production of Wagner's Parsifal, and do "odd jobs with lighting cues" while Nikisch conducted the Ring cycle.

=== First conducting work ===
Gustav Holst, whose suite The Planets Boult premiered in 1918

Boult made his début as a professional conductor on 27 February 1914 at West Kirby Public Hall, with members of the Liverpool Philharmonic Orchestra. His programme comprised orchestral works by Bach, Butterworth, Mozart, Schumann, Wagner and Hugo Wolf, interspersed with arias by Mozart and Verdi sung by Agnes Nicholls.

Boult was declared medically unfit for active service during the First World War, and until 1916 he served as an orderly officer in a reserve unit. He was recruited by the War Office as a translator (he spoke good French, German and Italian). In his spare time he organised and conducted concerts, some of which were subsidised by his father, with the aims of giving work to orchestral players and bringing music to a wider audience.

Just before the Armistice, Gustav Holst burst into my office: "Adrian, the YMCA are sending me to Salonika quite soon and Balfour Gardiner, bless his heart, has given me a parting present consisting of the Queen's Hall, full of the Queen's Hall Orchestra for the whole of a Sunday morning. So we're going to do The Planets, and you've got to conduct."

— Adrian Boult

In 1918 Boult conducted the London Symphony Orchestra in a series of concerts that included important recent British works. Among them was the première of a revised version of Vaughan Williams's A London Symphony, a performance which was "rather spoilt by a Zeppelin raid". His best-known première of this period was Holst's The Planets. Boult conducted the first performance on 29 September 1918 to an invited audience of about 250. Holst later wrote on his copy of the score, "This copy is the property of Adrian Boult who first caused The Planets to shine in public and thereby earned the gratitude of Gustav Holst."

Elgar was another composer who had cause to be grateful to Boult. His Second Symphony had, since its premiere nine years earlier, received few performances. When Boult conducted it at the Queen's Hall in March 1920 to "great applause" and "frantic enthusiasm", the composer wrote to him: "With the sounds ringing in my ears I send a word of thanks for your splendid conducting of the Sym. ... I feel that my reputation in the future is safe in your hands." Elgar's friend and biographer, the violinist W. H. Reed, wrote that Boult's performance of Elgar's neglected work brought "the grandeur and nobility of the work" to wider public attention.

Boult took a wide variety of conducting jobs in the years following the war. In 1919 he succeeded Ernest Ansermet as musical director of Sergei Diaghilev's ballet company. Although Ansermet gave Boult all the help he could in his preparations, there were fourteen ballets in the company's repertory – none of which Boult knew. In only a short period, Boult was required to master such scores as Petrushka, The Firebird, Scheherazade, La Boutique fantasque and The Good-Humoured Ladies.

In 1921 Boult conducted the British Symphony Orchestra for Vladimir Rosing's Opera Week at Aeolian Hall. He also took on an academic post. When Hugh Allen succeeded Sir Hubert Parry as principal of the Royal College of Music, he invited Boult to start a conducting class along the lines of Leipzig – the first such class in England. Boult ran the classes from 1919 to 1930. In 1921 he received a Doctorate of Music.

When Raymond Roze, the founder of the British Symphony Orchestra died in March 1920, Boult took over. He conducted the orchestra, made up of professional musicians who had served in the Army during the First World War, in a series of concerts at the Kingsway Hall. (Note: Boult made a number of recordings with the orchestra from November 1920, including The Good-Humoured Ladies, and the first recording of George Butterworth's A Shropshire Lad. In June 1921, he conducted for Theodore Komisarjevsky and Vladimir Rosing's small-scale Opera Intime week at London's Aeolian Hall with the principals of the British Symphony Orchestra. In 1921 and 1922 Boult conducted the orchestra in a series of concerts at the People's Palace (now part of Queen Mary College) in Mile End Road, London. His final appearance with the orchestra was at the 1923 Aberystwyth Festival, where Elgar conducted his own arrangement of Parry's "Jerusalem", including Sir Walford Davies at the piano.)

=== Birmingham ===
Boult in the early 1920s

In 1923 Boult conducted the first season of the Robert Mayer concerts for children, but his participation in the following season was prevented by his appointment in 1924 as conductor of the Birmingham Festival Choral Society. This led to his becoming musical director of the City of Birmingham Orchestra, where he remained in charge for six years, attracting widespread attention with his adventurous programmes.

The advantage of the Birmingham post was that for the first time in his life Boult not only had his own orchestra, but sole control of programming as well; the only time in his life, he later said, when that was so. The disadvantages were that the orchestra was inadequately funded, the available venues (including the Town Hall) were unsatisfactory, the Birmingham Post's music critic, A. J. Symons, was a constant thorn in Boult's side, and the local concert-going public had conservative tastes. Despite this conservatism, Boult programmed as much innovative music as was practical, including works by Mahler, Stravinsky and Bruckner. Such departures from the repertoire expected by the regular concert-goers depressed the box-office takings, requiring subsidies from private benefactors, including Boult's family.

While at Birmingham Boult had the opportunity to conduct a number of operas, chiefly with the British National Opera Company, for which he conducted Die Walküre and Otello. He also conducted a diverse range of operas from such composers as Purcell, Mozart and Vaughan Williams. In 1928 he succeeded Vaughan Williams as conductor of the Bach Choir in London, a position he held until 1931.

=== BBC Symphony Orchestra ===
Visits to London by the Hallé Orchestra and particularly the Berlin Philharmonic under Wilhelm Furtwängler in 1929, had highlighted the relatively poor standards of London orchestras. Sir Thomas Beecham and the director general of the BBC Sir John Reith were keen to establish a first-class symphony orchestra, and they agreed in principle to do so jointly. Only a small number of core players were recruited before negotiations foundered. Beecham withdrew, and with Malcolm Sargent soon established the rival London Philharmonic Orchestra.

In 1930 Boult returned to London to succeed Percy Pitt as director of music at the BBC. On taking up the post, Boult and his department recruited enough musicians to bring the complement of the new BBC Symphony Orchestra to 114. A substantial number of these players performed at the 1930 Promenade Concerts under Sir Henry Wood, and the full BBC Symphony Orchestra gave its first concert on 22 October 1930, conducted by Boult at the Queen's Hall. The programme consisted of music by Wagner, Brahms, Saint-Saëns and Ravel. Of the 21 programmes in the orchestra's first season, Boult conducted nine and Wood five.

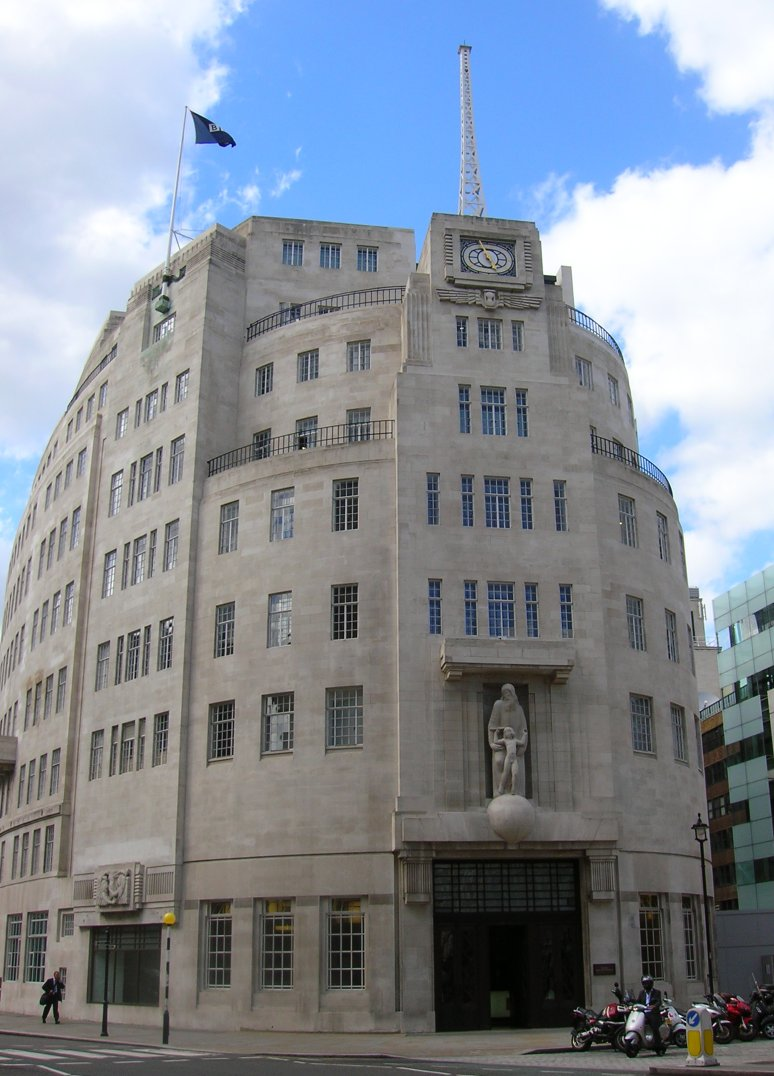
Broadcasting House, London, headquarters of the BBC, where Boult was director of music from 1930 to 1942

The reviews of the new orchestra were enthusiastic. The Times wrote of its "virtuosity" and of Boult's "superb" conducting. The Musical Times commented, "The boast of the B.B.C. that it intended to get together a first-class orchestra was not an idle one" and spoke of "exhilaration" at the playing. The Observer called the playing "altogether magnificent" and said that Boult "deserves an instrument of this fine calibre to work on, and the orchestra deserves a conductor of his efficiency and insight." After the initial concerts Reith was told by his advisers that the orchestra had played better for Boult than anyone else. Reith asked him if he wished to take on the chief conductorship, and if so whether he would resign as director of music or occupy both posts simultaneously. Boult opted for the latter. He later said that this was a rash decision, and that he could not have sustained the two roles at once without the efforts of his staff in the music department, which included Edward Clark, Julian Herbage and Kenneth Wright.

During the 1930s the BBC Symphony Orchestra became renowned for its high standard of playing and for Boult's capable performances of new and unfamiliar music. Like Henry Wood before him, Boult regarded it as his duty to give the best possible performances of a wide range of composers, including those whose works were not personally congenial to him. His biographer, Michael Kennedy, writes that there was a very short list of composers whose works Boult refused to conduct, "but it would be difficult to deduce who they were." Boult's pioneering work with the BBC included an early performance of Schoenberg's Variations, Op. 31, British premières, including Alban Berg's opera Wozzeck and Three Movements from the Lyric Suite, and world premières, including Vaughan Williams's Symphony No. 4 in F minor and Bartók's Concerto for Two Pianos and Orchestra. He introduced Mahler's Ninth Symphony to London in 1934, and Bartók's Concerto for Orchestra in 1946. Boult invited Anton Webern to conduct eight BBC concerts between 1931 and 1936.

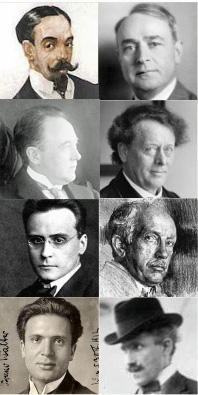
Guest conducting for Boult in the 1930s: from top left, clockwise, Beecham, Koussevitzky, Mengelberg, Richard Strauss, Toscanini, Walter, Webern, Weingartner.

The excellence of Boult's orchestra attracted leading international conductors. In its second season guest conductors included Richard Strauss, Felix Weingartner and Bruno Walter, followed, in later seasons, by Serge Koussevitzky, Beecham and Willem Mengelberg. Arturo Toscanini, widely regarded at the time as the world's leading conductor, conducted the BBC orchestra in 1935 and said that it was the finest he had ever directed. He returned to conduct the orchestra in 1937, 1938 and 1939.

During this period, Boult accepted some international guest conductorships, appearing with the Vienna Philharmonic, Boston Symphony, and New York Philharmonic orchestras. In 1936 and 1937 he headed European tours with the BBC Symphony Orchestra, giving concerts in Brussels, Paris, Zurich, Budapest and Vienna, where they were especially well received. During his BBC years, Boult did not entirely lose contact with the world of opera and his performances of Die Walküre at Covent Garden in 1931 and Fidelio at Sadler's Wells Theatre in 1930 were considered outstanding.

For many years, Boult had been a close friend of the tenor Steuart Wilson and his wife Ann, née Bowles. When, in the late 1920s, Wilson began to mistreat his wife, Boult took her side. (Note: Richard Aldous, in his biography of Malcolm Sargent, alleges that Boult and Ann Wilson were having an affair before her divorce from Wilson, but the source he cites (Kennedy, pp. 81, 111, 161–63) does not corroborate his statement.) She divorced Wilson in 1931. In 1933, Boult astonished those who knew his notorious shyness with women by marrying her and becoming a much-loved stepfather to her four children; the marriage lasted for the rest of his life. The enmity it provoked in Wilson had repercussions in Boult's later career. The stigma attached to divorce in Britain in the 1930s affected Wilson's career but not Boult's: Wilson was barred from performing in English cathedrals at the Three Choirs Festival but Boult was invited to conduct the orchestra at Westminster Abbey for the coronation of George VI in 1937.

During the Second World War the BBC Symphony Orchestra was evacuated first to Bristol, where it suffered from bombing, and later to Bedford. Boult strove to maintain standards and morale as he lost key players. Between 1939 and the end of the war, forty players left for active service or other activities. In 1942 Boult resigned as the BBC's director of music, while remaining chief conductor of the BBC Symphony Orchestra. This move, made as a favour to the composer Arthur Bliss to provide a suitable war-time job for him, later came to be Boult's undoing at the BBC. Meanwhile, he made recordings of Elgar's Second Symphony, Holst's The Planets and Vaughan Williams's Job, A Masque for Dancing. At the end of the war Boult "found a changed attitude to the orchestra in the upper echelons of the BBC". Reith was no longer director general, and without his backing Boult had to fight hard to restore the orchestra to its pre-war glory.

On 29 September 1946 Boult conducted Britten's new Festival Overture, to inaugurate the BBC Third Programme. For this innovative cultural channel, Boult was concerned in pioneering ventures including the British premiere of Mahler's Third Symphony. The Times later said of this period, "The Third Programme could not possibly have had the scope which made it world-famous musically without Boult." Nevertheless, Boult's BBC days were numbered. When he was appointed in 1930, Reith had informally promised him that would be exempt from the BBC's rule that staff must retire at age 60. However, Reith had left the BBC in 1938 and his promise carried no weight with his successors. In 1948 Steuart Wilson was appointed head of music at the BBC, the post previously occupied by Boult and Bliss. He made it clear from the start of his appointment that he intended that Boult should be replaced as chief conductor, and he used his authority to insist on Boult's enforced retirement. (Note: In a biography of Wilson (English Singer, London, Duckworth, 1970, ISBN 0-7156-0468-6), Wilson's third wife, Margaret, disputes this and says that relations between the two were now amicable, and it was others at the BBC who were pressing for Boult's removal.) The director general of the BBC at the time, Sir William Haley, was unaware of Wilson's animus against Boult and later acknowledged, in a broadcast tribute to Boult, that he "had listened to ill-judged advice in retiring him." By the time of his retirement in 1950, Boult had made 1,536 broadcasts.

=== London Philharmonic ===
After it became clear that Boult would have to leave the BBC, Thomas Russell, the managing director of the London Philharmonic Orchestra (LPO), offered him the post of principal conductor of the LPO in succession to Eduard van Beinum. In the 1930s the LPO had flourished, but since Beecham's departure in 1940, it had struggled to survive. Boult was well known to the orchestra, having been among the musicians who came to its aid in 1940. (Note: Boult obtained leave from the BBC to conduct fund-raising concerts for the LPO. Others who came to the aid of the orchestra at that time included Wood, Sargent and Eileen Joyce) He took over as chief conductor of the LPO in June 1950, immediately after leaving the BBC, and threw himself into the task of rebuilding it. In the early years of his conductorship, the finances of the LPO were perilous, and Boult subsidised the orchestra from his own funds for some time. The need to earn money obliged the orchestra to play many more concerts than its rivals. In the 1949–50 season, the LPO gave 248 concerts, compared with 55 by the BBC Symphony Orchestra, 103 by the London Symphony Orchestra, and 32 apiece by the Philharmonia and Royal Philharmonic orchestras.

Boult's first recordings with the LPO were of Elgar (top), Mahler and Beethoven (bottom).

Although he had worked extensively in the studio for the BBC, Boult had, up to this point, recorded only a part of his large repertoire for the gramophone. With the LPO he began a series of commercial recordings that continued at a varying rate for the rest of his working life. Their first recordings together were Elgar's Falstaff, Mahler's Lieder eines fahrenden Gesellen with the mezzo-soprano Blanche Thebom, and Beethoven's First Symphony. The work of the new team was greeted with approval by the reviewers. Of the Elgar, The Gramophone wrote, "I have heard no other conductor approach [Boult's] performance. ... His newly adopted orchestra responds admirably". In The Manchester Guardian, Neville Cardus wrote, "Nobody is better able than Sir Adrian Boult to expound the subtly mingled contents of this master work."

In January 1951 Boult and the LPO made a tour of Germany, described by Kennedy as "gruelling", with 12 concerts on 12 successive days. The symphonies they played were Beethoven's Seventh, Haydn's London, No 104, Brahms's First, Schumann's Fourth and Schubert's Great C major. The other works were Elgar's Introduction and Allegro, Holst's The Perfect Fool ballet music, Richard Strauss's Don Juan, and Stravinsky's Firebird.

In 1952 the LPO negotiated a five-year contract with Decca Records, which was unusually rewarding for the orchestra, giving it a 10 per cent commission on most sales. On top of this, Boult always contributed his share of the recording fees to the orchestra's funds. In the same year, the LPO survived a crisis when Russell was dismissed as its managing director. He was an avowed member of the Communist party; when the Cold War began some influential members of the LPO felt that Russell's private political affiliations compromised the orchestra, and pressed for his dismissal. Boult, as the orchestra's chief conductor, stood up for Russell, but when matters came to a head Boult ceased to protect him. Deprived of that crucial support, Russell was forced out. Kennedy speculates that Boult's change of mind was due to a growing conviction that the orchestra would be "seriously jeopardized financially" if Russell remained in post. A later writer, Richard Witts, suggests that Boult sacrificed Russell because he believed doing so would enhance the LPO's chance of being appointed resident orchestra at the Royal Festival Hall. (Note: Witts's opinion is that it was not Russell but Boult – regarded by some as past his peak – who cost the LPO the Festival Hall residency.)

In 1953 Boult once again took charge of the orchestral music at a coronation, conducting an ensemble drawn from UK orchestras at the coronation of Elizabeth II. During the proceedings, he conducted the first performances of Bliss's Processional and Walton's march Orb and Sceptre. In the same year he returned to the Proms after a three-year absence, conducting the LPO. The notices were mixed: The Times found a Brahms symphony "rather colourless, imprecise and uninspiring", but praised Boult and the orchestra's performance of The Planets. In the same year the orchestra celebrated its 21st birthday, giving a series of concerts at the Festival Hall and the Royal Albert Hall in which Boult was joined by guest conductors including Paul Kletzki, Jean Martinon, Hans Schmidt-Isserstedt, Georg Solti, Walter Susskind and Vaughan Williams.

In 1956 Boult and the LPO visited Russia. Boult had not wished to go on the tour because flying hurt his ears, and long land journeys hurt his back. The Soviet authorities threatened to cancel the tour if he did not lead it, and he felt obliged to go. The LPO gave nine concerts in Moscow and four in Leningrad. Boult's assistant conductors were Anatole Fistoulari and George Hurst. Boult's four Moscow programmes included Vaughan Williams's Fourth and Fifth Symphonies, Holst's The Planets, Walton's Violin Concerto (with Alfredo Campoli as soloist), and Schubert's Great C major Symphony. While in Moscow, Boult and his wife visited the Bolshoi Opera and were guests at the composer Dmitri Shostakovich's 50th birthday party.

After the Russian tour, Boult told the LPO that he wished to step down from the principal conductorship. He continued to be the orchestra's main conductor until his successor William Steinberg took up the post in 1959. After the sudden resignation of Andrzej Panufnik from the City of Birmingham Symphony Orchestra (CBSO), Boult returned as principal conductor of the CBSO for the 1959–60 season. That was his last chief conductorship, though he remained closely associated with the LPO as its president and a guest conductor until his retirement.

=== Later years ===
After stepping down from the chief conductorship of the LPO, Boult was, for a few years, less in demand in the recording studio and the concert hall. Nevertheless, he was invited to conduct in Vienna, Amsterdam and Boston. In 1964 he made no recordings, but in 1965 he began an association with Lyrita records, an independent label specialising in British music. In the same year he resumed recording for EMI after a six-year break. Celebrations for his eightieth birthday in 1969 also raised his profile in the musical world. After the death of his colleague Sir John Barbirolli in 1970, Boult was seen as "the sole survivor of a great generation" and a living link with Elgar, Vaughan Williams and Holst. In the words of The Guardian, "it was when he reached his late seventies that the final and most glorious period of his career developed." He ceased to accept overseas invitations, but conducted in the major British cities, as well as at the Festival and Albert Halls and began what is frequently called his "Indian Summer" in the concert hall and recording studio. He was featured in a 1971 film The Point of the Stick, in which he illustrated his conducting technique with musical examples.

At a spare recording session in August 1970 Boult recorded the Third Symphony of Brahms. This was well received and led to a series of recordings of Brahms, Wagner, Schubert, Mozart and Beethoven. His repertoire in general was much wider than his discography might suggest. (Note: Boult conducted seven of the nine Mahler symphonies well before the Mahler revival of the 1960s: the First, Third, Fourth, Fifth, Seventh, Eighth and Ninth, and he programmed Ravel's complete ballet Daphnis et Chloé and Ferruccio Busoni's rarely staged opera Doktor Faust in the late 1940s. He conducted Berg's Wozzeck before and after the war, regarding it as a masterpiece.) It was a disappointment to him that he was rarely invited to conduct in the opera house, and he relished the opportunity to record extensive excerpts from the Wagner operas in the 1970s. Having conducted several ballets at Covent Garden during the 1970s, Boult gave his last public performance conducting Elgar's ballet The Sanguine Fan for the London Festival Ballet at the London Coliseum on 24 June 1978. His final record, completed in December 1978, was of music by Hubert Parry. Boult formally retired from conducting in 1981. He died in London in 1983, aged 93, leaving his body to medical science.

== Musicianship ==
A review in The Observer of Boult's second London concert, in 1918, said, "Having, apparently, a thorough knowledge of the work, he was content to let it speak for itself without having recourse to those aids to success which are a constant temptation to conductors." Sixty-five years later, in an obituary tribute, Peter Heyworth wrote in the same newspaper: "From Nikisch he had early acquired an immaculate stick technique and was quietly scathing about conductors who used their anatomy to indicate their artistic requirements. ... In an occupation ridden with inflated egos and circus tricksters Boult brought a rare probity to everything he undertook."

Boult's biographer, Kennedy, gave this summary: "In the music he admired most, Boult was often a great conductor; in the rest, an extremely conscientious one. ... If from behind he seemed unexciting and unemotional, the players could see the animation in his face – and he was capable of frightening outbursts of temper at rehearsals. Tall and erect, with something of the military in his appearance ... he seemed the personification of the English gentleman. But recipients of his cutting wit and occasional sarcasm knew that this was not the whole picture." Grove's Dictionary similarly said of him:

Of the leading British conductors of his time, Boult was the least sensational but not the least remarkable. He made no attempt to cultivate a public image. He was neither oracle, orator nor professional wit, but he expressed himself with trenchancy, and his gentlemanly self-control was occasionally ruffled by storms of anger. ... [T]here were nights when the physical impact of his conducting was low, and there was little beyond faithfulness to the notes. There were others when precise, sensitive stick technique, loyalty to the composer, selflessness and ability to see the music as a whole, produced results equally satisfying in the classics and the British music he understood so well.

Boult, unlike many of his contemporaries, preferred the traditional orchestral layout, with first violins on the conductor's left and the seconds on the right. Of the modern layout with all violins on the left, he wrote, "The new seating is, I admit, easier for the conductor and the second violins, but I firmly maintain that the second violins themselves sound far better on the right. ... When the new fashion reached us from America somewhere about 1908 it was adopted by some conductors, but Richter, Weingartner, Walter, Toscanini and many others kept what I feel is the right balance."

This care for balance was an important feature of Boult's music-making. Orchestral players across decades commented on his insistence that every important part should be heard without difficulty. His BBC principal violist wrote in 1938, "If a woodwind player has to complain that he has already been blowing 'fit to burst' there is trouble for somebody." The trombonist Raymond Premru wrote forty years later, "One of the old school, like Boult, is so refreshing because he will reduce the dynamic level – 'No, no, pianissimo, strings, let the soloist through, less from everyone else.' That is the old idea of balance."

As an educator, Boult influenced several generations of musicians, beginning with his conducting class at the Royal College of Music, London, which he ran from 1919 to 1930. As no such classes had been held before in Britain, Boult "created its curriculum from out of his own experience. ... From that first small class has come all the later formal training for conductors throughout Britain." In the 1930s Boult ran a series of "conferences for conductors" at his country house near Guildford, sometimes helped by Vaughan Williams who lived a few miles away. From 1962 to 1966 he again taught at the Royal College of Music. In later life, he made time for young conductors who sought his counsel. Among those who studied with or were influenced by Boult were Colin Davis, James Loughran, Richard Hickox and Vernon Handley. The last was not only a pupil of Boult, but acted as his musical assistant on many occasions.

== Honours and memorials ==
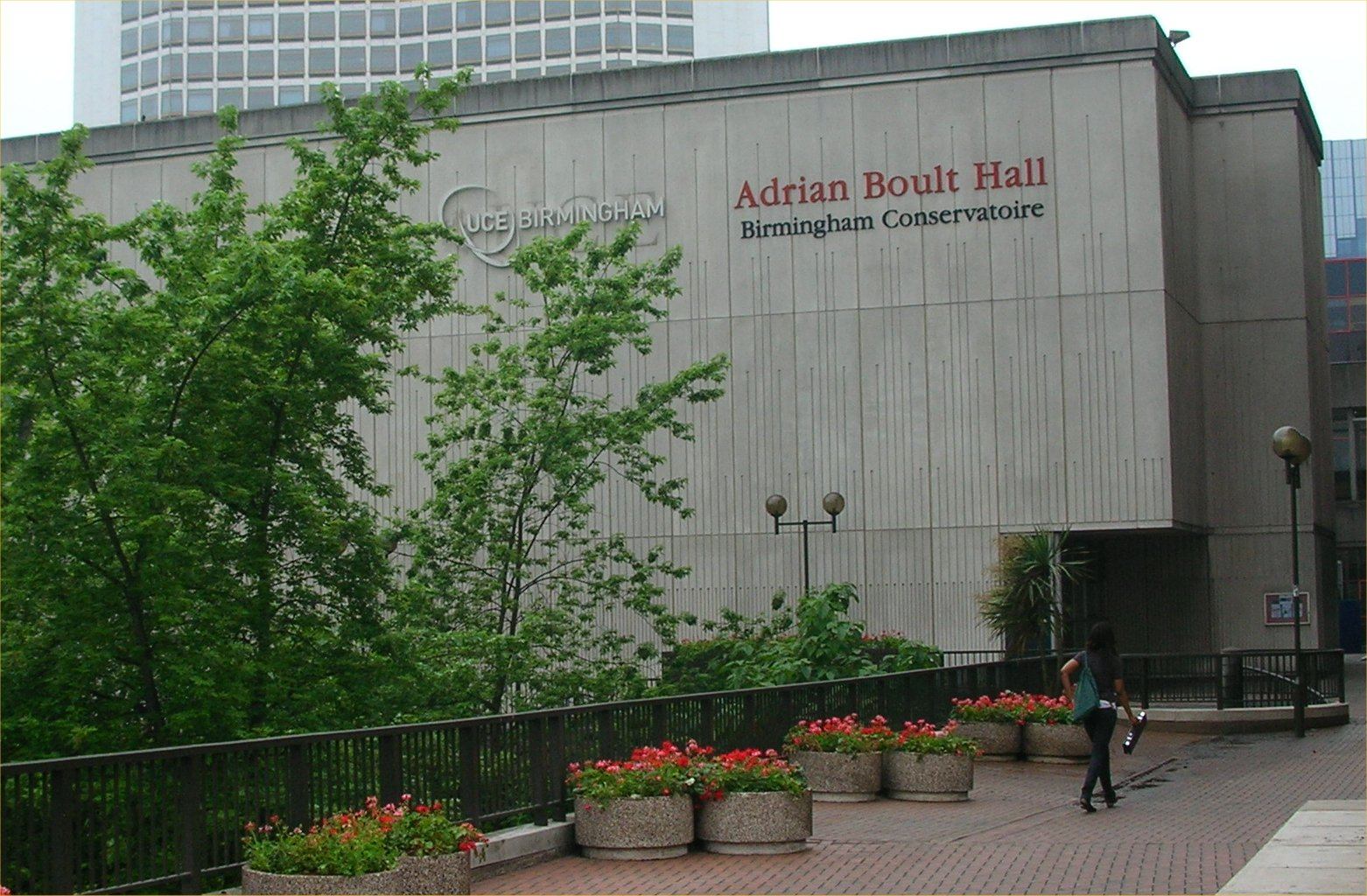
Adrian Boult Hall, Birmingham

Boult was created a Knight Bachelor in 1937 and was created a Member of the Order of the Companions of Honour (CH) in 1969. He received the gold medal of the Royal Philharmonic Society in 1944 and the Harvard Glee Club medal (jointly with Vaughan Williams) in 1956. He received honorary degrees and fellowships from 13 universities and conservatoires. In 1951 he was invited to be the first president of the Elgar Society. In 1959 he was made president of the Royal Scottish Academy of Music. In the north choir aisle of Westminster Abbey is a small memorial stone to Boult which was unveiled on 8 April 1984.

Boult's old school, Westminster, has a music centre named in his honour, and the Royal Birmingham Conservatoire included in its home building the Adrian Boult Hall. The hall was used for classical concerts, other musical performances, and conferences. The hall was demolished in June 2016 as part of a redevelopment project.

In the June 2013 issue of Gramophone Boult was added to the magazine's Hall of Fame which recognises musicians who have made a lasting impact on the world of recorded classical music.

== Recordings ==
Boult was a prolific recording artist. Unlike many musicians, he felt at home in the recording studio and actually preferred working without an audience. His recording career stretched from the days of acoustic recording until the beginning of the digital era. His last recording of The Planets made in May 1978 was taped in experimental digital sound, although technical problems led EMI to release an analogue version.

Boult's recordings fall into three main periods. In the first, from 1920 to the end of the 1940s, he recorded almost exclusively for HMV/EMI. In the 1950s and early 1960s, he was less in demand by the major labels, and although he made a substantial number of discs for Decca, he recorded mostly for smaller labels, chiefly Pye Nixa. His last period, from the mid-1960s, sometimes referred to as his Indian Summer, was once again with HMV. With his regular collaborators the producer Christopher Bishop and the engineer Christopher Parker he made more than sixty recordings, re-recording much of his key repertoire in stereo. He also added many works to his discography that he had not recorded before.

Of the British composers, Boult extensively recorded and sometimes re-recorded major works by Elgar and Vaughan Williams. He recorded all eight then-existing symphonies by Vaughan Williams for Decca Records in the 1950s with the LPO, in the presence of the composer. The recording producer, John Culshaw, wrote that the composer "said very little during the sessions because he was totally in favour of Sir Adrian's approach to his music." Vaughan Williams was to have been present for the first recording of his Ninth symphony, for Everest Records in 1958, but he died the night before the session took place; Boult recorded a short introduction as a memorial tribute. All these recordings have been reissued on CD. In the 1960s Boult re-recorded the nine symphonies for EMI.

Other British composers who feature significantly in Boult's discography include Holst, Ireland, Parry, and Walton. Despite his reputation as a pioneer in Britain of the works of the Second Viennese School and other avant-garde composers, the record companies, unlike the BBC, remained cautious about recording him in this repertory, and only a single recording of a Berg piece represents this side of Boult's work. In the core continental orchestral repertoire, Boult's recordings of the four symphonies of Brahms, and the Great C major Symphony of Schubert were celebrated in his lifetime and have remained in the catalogues during the three decades after his death. Late in his recording career he recorded four discs of excerpts from Wagner's operas, which received great critical praise. (Note: See, for instance, Deryck Cooke, The Gramophone, July 1972, p. 197: "He reveals himself as a 'perfect Wagnerite', and a thrilling one too ... a 'must' for Wagner-lovers".) The exceptional breadth of Boult's repertoire has left some well-regarded recordings of works not immediately associated with him, among which are versions of Berlioz’s Ouvertures (recorded in 1956), Franck's Symphony (recorded in 1959), Dvořák's Cello Concerto with Mstislav Rostropovich (1958), and a pioneering recording of Mahler's Third Symphony taped live in 1947.

== Bibliography ==
Boult wrote articles on a wide range of musical matters. They include an obituary of Nikisch (Music and Letters, Vol. 3, No. 2 (April 1922), pp. 117–121); "Casals as Conductor" (Music and Letters, Vol. 4 (1923), pp. 149–52); "Rosé and the Vienna Philharmonic" (Music and Letters, Vol. 32, No. 3 (July 1951), pp. 256–57); and an obituary of Toscanini for The Musical Times (March 1957, pp. 127–28)

Boult wrote books about music throughout his career. None were in print at April 2010. They are as follows:

- Boult on Music: Words from a Lifetime's Communication. London: Toccata Press. 1983. ISBN 0-907689-03-5.
- A Handbook on the Technique of Conducting (7th ed.). Oxford: Hall. 1951 [1920]. OCLC 155756343.
- My Own Trumpet [autobiography]. London: Hamish Hamilton. 1973. ISBN 0-241-02445-5.
- The St. Matthew Passion: its preparation and performance. London: Novello. 1949. OCLC 1547942. (with Walter Emery)
- Thoughts on Conducting. London: Phoenix House. 1963. OCLC 892145.

== Notes, references and sources ==
=== Sources ===
- Aldous, Richard (2001). Tunes of Glory: The Life of Malcolm Sargent. London: Pimlico. ISBN 0-7126-6540-4.
- Bland, Alexander (1981). The Royal Ballet – the first 50 years. London: Threshold Books. ISBN 0-901366-11-0.
- Boult, Adrian (1973). My Own Trumpet. London: Hamish Hamilton. ISBN 0-241-02445-5.
- Chesterman, Robert (1976). Conversations with Conductors: Bruno Walter, Sir Adrian Boult, Leonard Bernstein, Ernest Ansermet, Otto Klemperer, Leopold Stokowski. London: Robson Books. ISBN 978-0-90-389544-6.
- Culshaw, John (1981). Putting the Record Straight. London: Secker and Warburg. ISBN 0-436-11802-5.
- Hill, Ralph (1951). Music 1951. Harmondsworth: Penguin Books. OCLC 26147349.
- Kennedy, Michael (1987). Adrian Boult. London: Hamish Hamilton. ISBN 0-333-48752-4.
- Moore, Jerrold Northrop (1979). Music and Friends: Letters to Adrian Boult. London: Hamish Hamilton. ISBN 0-241-10178-6.
- Morrison, Richard (2004). Orchestra – The LSO. London: Faber and Faber. ISBN 0-571-21584-X.
- Previn, André, ed. (1979). Orchestra. London: Macdonald and Janes. ISBN 0-354-04420-6.
- Reed, W H (1943). Elgar. London: J M Dent. OCLC 8858707.
- Russell, Thomas (1944). Philharmonic Decade. London: Hutchinson. OCLC 941577.
- Shore, Bernard (1938). The Orchestra Speaks. London: Longmans. OCLC 499119110.
- Simeone, Nigel; Simon Mundy (1980). Sir Adrian Boult: Companion of Honour. London: Midas Books. ISBN 0-85936-212-4.
