= 9th Army Corps (Russian Empire) =

- Active: 1813–1918
- Country: Russian Empire; Russian Republic
- Branch: (Russian Empire) Imperial Russian Army
- Size: ~20,000
- HQ: Kiev
- Engagements: War of the Sixth Coalition; Battle of Leipzig; Russo-Turkish War (1877–1878); First World War; Eastern Front; Battle of Galicia; Gorlice–Tarnów Offensive

The 9th Army Corps was an Army corps in the Imperial Russian Army.

== Composition ==
In July 1914:

- 5th Infantry Division
- 42nd Infantry Division
- 9th Cavalry Division
- 2nd Horse Mountain-Artillery Division
- 9th Howitzer Artillery Battalion
- 6th Sapper Battalion
- 6th Pontoon Battalion
- 4th Telegraph Company

== Part of ==
- 3rd Army: 2 August 1914 – 21 July 1915
- 3rd Army: 18 September 1915 – 13 February 1916
- 4th Army: 8 March 1916 – 3 April 1916
- 3rd Army: 14 April 1916 – 1 June 1916
- 4th Army: 20 June 1916 – 17 July 1916
- 2nd Army: 1 August 1916 – December 1917

== Commanders ==
- Nikolay Kridener: 1877 – 1878
- Arkady Dmitrievich Stolypin: 1878 – 1886
- Dmitry Shcherbachev: 1912 – 1915
- Abram Dragomirov: 1915 – 1916
- Nikolay Kiselevsky: 1916 – April 1917
- Pyotr Telezhnikov: May 1917 – September 1917
- Andrey Snesarev: September 1917 – November 1917
