= Arkady Skugarevsky =

Russian division and corps commander

Arkady Platonovich Skugarevsky
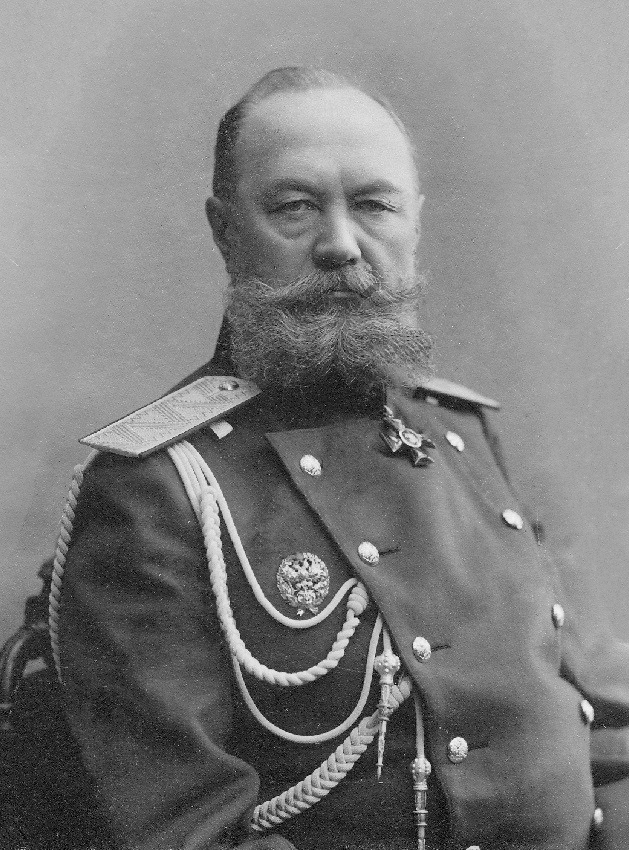
- Skugarevsky in 1912
- Born: 17 January 1847
- Died: Unknown
- Allegiance: Russian Empire
- Branch: Imperial Russian Army
- Commands: 27th Infantry Division; 6th Army Corps; 8th Army Corps
- Conflicts: Russo-Turkish War; Russo-Japanese War
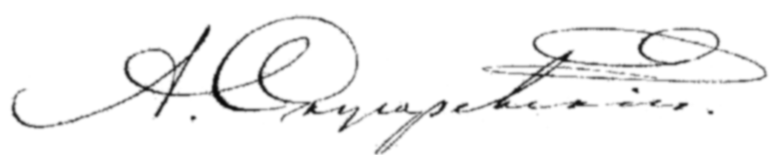
- Signature

Arkady Platonovich Skugarevsky (Russian, Аркадий Платонович Скугаревский, 17 January 1847 – ) was an Imperial Russian division and corps commander. He fought in World War I against the Ottoman Empire and the Empire of Japan. He was Chairman of the Committee on Education of the Troops from 1906 to 1909. He was a member of the military council from 1909 to 27 April 1912.

== Awards ==
- Order of Saint Anna, 3rd class, 1874
- Gold Sword for Bravery, 1878
- Order of Saint Vladimir, 4th class, 1878
- Order of Saint Stanislaus (House of Romanov), 2nd class, 1879
- Order of Saint Vladimir, 3rd class, 1890
- Order of Saint Stanislaus (House of Romanov), 1st class, 1893
- Order of Saint Anna, 1st class, 1898
- Order of Saint Vladimir, 2nd class, 1902
- Order of the White Eagle (Russian Empire), 1909

Foreign:

- House and Merit Order of Peter Frederick Louis, 1884
- Order of the Red Eagle, 2nd class, 1888

== Writings ==
- Practical notes on tactics//military collection, 1873, no. 2
- Battlefields of war 1870//military collection, 1874, no. 5-6
- War game. Collection of tasks for tactical exercises, St. Petersburg, 1874
- About military history//military collection, 1875, no. 1
- Guide to tactical exercises with the collection tasks, St. Petersburg, 1875
- Battle of Nachod 27 June 1866, with Konstantin Durop and Nikolai Engelhardt — St. Petersburg: typography in. Demakova, 1875
- Collection of tasks for combat tactics officers, with Nikolai Engelhardt — St. Petersburg, 1880
- Attack infantry: parsing of contentious issues. — St. Petersburg: typography and Was Fjusno, 1888. -80 p., 1 l. heck.
- From the beginning of the 1812 war to Smolensk: practical techniques for the study of military history. - Kazan: typo-lithography Imperial University, 1898. [2], VI, 171 pp., 14 leaves, cards.
- Essays and notes. H 1–2. — St. Petersburg, 1913

== Sources ==
- Глиноецкий, Николай Павлович Исторический очерк Николаевской академии Генерального штаба. — СПб.: Типография штаба войск гвардии и Петербургского военного округа, 1882
- Лукомский, Александр Сергеевич Очерки из моей жизни. Воспоминания. — М.: Айрис-пресс, 2012. — ISBN 978-5-8112-4483-6
- «Разведчик». No. 1145. 9 October 1912
- Список генералам по старшинству. Составлен по 1-е июня 1911 года. — СПб.: Военная типография, 1911

Preceded by	Chief of Staff of the 1st Guards Infantry Division; 1881–1888	Succeeded by
Preceded by	Commander of the 27th Infantry Division; 1898–1904	Succeeded by
Preceded by	Commander of the 6th Army Corps; 1904–1905	Succeeded by
Preceded by	Commander of the 8th Army Corps; 1905–1906	Succeeded by
