= Samuel Instone =

British shipping and aviation entrepreneur (1878–1937)

Sir Samuel Instone
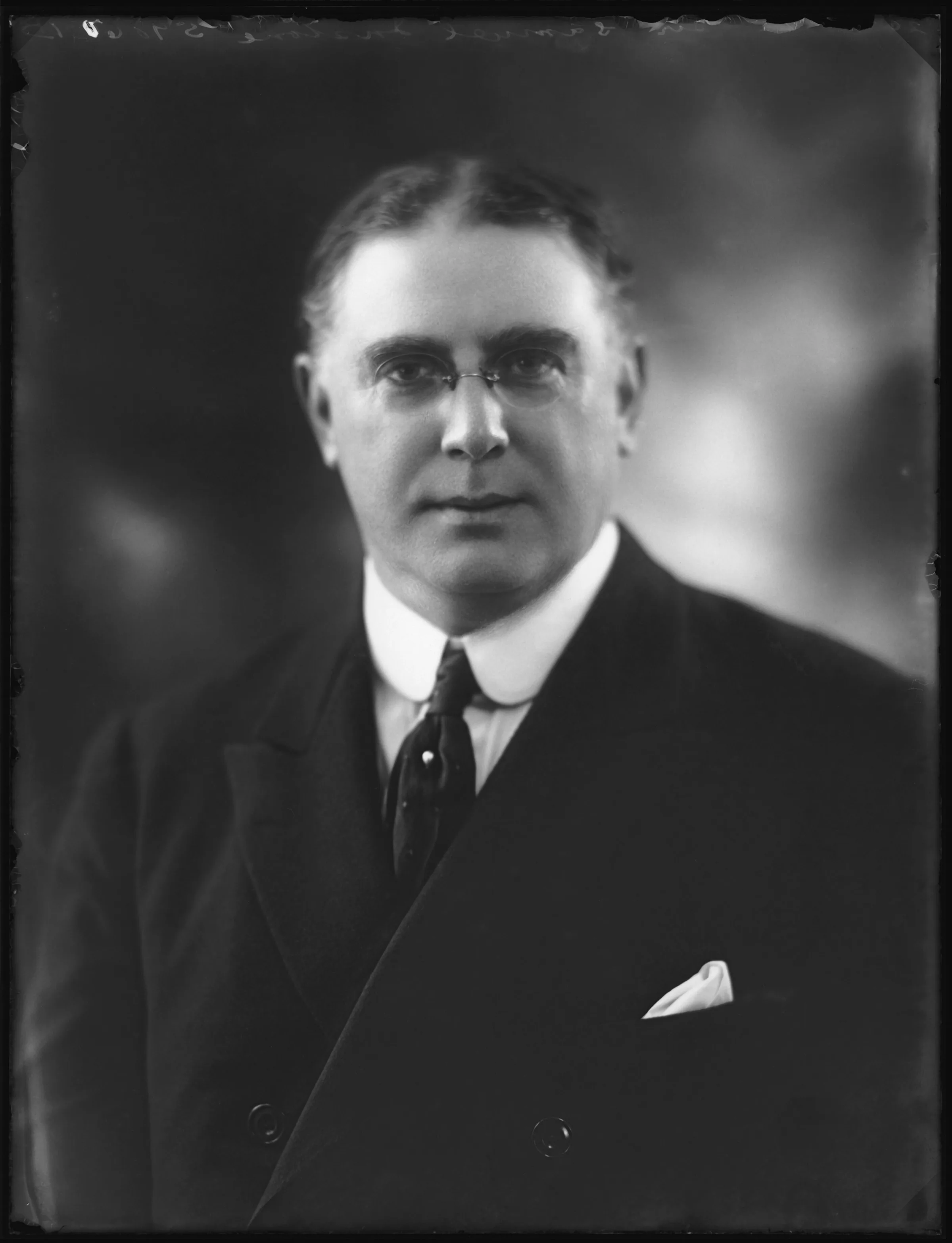
- Instone in 1922
- Born: 16 August 1878; Gravesend, Kent, England
- Died: 9 November 1937 (aged 59); London, England
- Occupation: Business
- Spouse(s): Alice Maud Liebman, Lady Instone (m. 1910)

Sir Samuel Instone (16 August 1878 – 9 November 1937) was a British shipping and aviation entrepreneur. As founder of the Instone Air Line, he was among the leaders of the nascent air transport business.

== Personal history ==
Instone was born in Gravesend, Kent, the eldest of three brothers born to Adolphe Instone and Maria Jacob. The family was Jewish, with Adolphe's surname at birth in Fellheim, Bavaria, Germany being Einstein. The family name was later anglicized to Instone.

He was educated at Tunbridge Wells and in the French port city of Boulogne-sur-Mer, where he began his business career at age 15.

He came to Cardiff in Wales in 1908 to work for a shipping company as a manager. With his brother, Theodore Instone, he went into business as a coal factor in 1908, and in 1914 bought the ship, Collivaud from Morels. After World War I, the brothers owned ten vessels shipping coal from the South Wales valleys. It was during this period that Samuel diversified into coal mining with the acquisition of the Bedwas colliery. In 1919 Instone Air Line was set up by Samuel along with another brother Alfred, and started an air route from Cardiff to Paris. Due to the depression of the 1920s Samuel saw his shipping interests wane, and by 1925 the last of his ships were sold.

Instone was constantly at the front of commercial and technological trends within the aviation business. On 19 August 1920, Sir Samuel Instone had a telephone conversation from his home in London to a passenger on a flight destined for Paris. This call to a Vickers aeroplane is thought to be the first telephone call to an inflight aircraft. He also introduced uniforms for his flight crews, the first non-military air service to do so. In 1921 Samuel was knighted, and represented the Chamber of Shipping at Air Conferences in England and the International Chamber of Commerce at the League of Nations, Geneva.

He was also a Freeman of the City of London and Commander of the Belgian Order of Leopold.

== Social enterprises ==
In 1922, Frank L. Barnard, chief pilot of Instone Air Line won the first King's Cup Race. Sir Instone took the trophy with him on a visit to Bedwas Colliery, and it was allowed to be displayed in a local shop's window.

As an act of public service, Samuel Instone and his brother Theodore once offered to hire Harry Grindell Matthews in order to keep his reported death ray in the United Kingdom.

== Personal life ==
In 1910, Instone married Alice Maud Liebman and they had five daughters. He died unexpectedly in a London nursing home in 1937 following surgery, after being expected to make a good recovery. His memorial service was held at the West London Synagogue and he was buried at the Willesden Jewish Cemetery. His daughter Anna married Julian Herbage.
