= 27th Infantry Division (Russian Empire) =

- 27-я пехотная дивизия
- Active: 1863–1918
- Country: Russian Empire
- Branch: Russian Imperial Army
- Role: Infantry

The 27th Infantry Division (Russian: 27-я пехо́тная диви́зия, 27-ya Pekhotnaya Diviziya) was an infantry formation of the Russian Imperial Army. It was a part of the 3rd Army Corps.

== Organization ==
- 1st Brigade
  - 105th Infantry Regiment
  - 106th Infantry Regiment
- 2nd Brigade
  - 107th Infantry Regiment
  - 108th Infantry Regiment
- 27th Artillery Brigade

== Commanders ==
- 1863-1876: Nikolay Kridener
- 11/01/1876 - 11/08/1888 - Major General (from 08/30/1878 Lieutenant General) Zalesov, Nikolai Gavrilovich
- хх.хх.1888 - 03.03.1889 - Lieutenant General Depp, Alexander-August Filippovich
- 04.16.1889 - xx.02.1890 - Lieutenant General Elzhanovsky, Kazimir Yulianovich
- 03/04/1890 - 03/07/1891 - Lieutenant General Rykachev, Stepan Vasilievich
- 03/13/1891 - 12/07/1892 - Lieutenant General Timrot, Karl Alexandrovich
- 09.12.1892 - 01.18, 1896 - Major General (from August 30, 1893 Lieutenant General) Tyvalovich, Ivan Ivanovich
- 18.01.1896 - 18.08.1898 - Major General (from 14 May, 1896 Lieutenant General) Gets, Dmitry Nikolaevich
- 26 October, 1898 - 03.09, 1904 - Major General (from 06.12, 1898 Lieutenant General) Arkady Skugarevsky
- 11/19, 1904 - 12/06/1906 - Major General Sivers, Faddey Vasilievich
- 06.12.1906 - 16.01.1909 - Lieutenant General Shvank, Leonid Alexandrovich
- 01/27/1909 - 02/19/1914 - Lieutenant General Fleischer, Rafail Nikolaevich
- 02/19/1914 - 03/13/1914 - Lieutenant General Abakanovich, Stanislav Konstantinovich
- 04/02/1914 - 02/02/1915 - Lieutenant General Adaridi, August-Karl-Mikhail Mikhailovich
- 02/08/1915 - 04/04/1915 - Lieutenant General Johnson, Herbert Georgievich
- 04/04/1915 - 02/18/1916 - Major General Asmus, Konstantin Vladimirovich
- 03/19/1916 - 04/18/1917 - Lieutenant General Stavrovich, Nikolai Grigorievich
- from 18.04.1917 - Major General Bonch-Bogdanovsky, Alexander Mikhailovich

== Chiefs of Staff ==
- 10.10.1865 - 24.04.1872 - Lieutenant Colonel (from 31.03.1868 Colonel) Butenko, Semyon Ivanovich
- 04/29/1872 - xx.xx.1875 - Colonel Ustrugov, Dmitry Ivanovich
- 07/05/1875 - 09/12/1883 - Colonel Drozdovich, Emelyan Mikhailovich
- 09/23/1883 - 01/14/1885 - etc. Colonel Novogrebelsky, Stanislav Stanislavovich
- 14.01.1885 - 04.04.1886 - Colonel Pnevsky, Vyacheslav Ivanovich
- 04.04.1886 - 03.19.1890 - Colonel Claus, Pavel Fedorovich
- 03/22/1890 - 07/09/1891 - Colonel Melnitsky, Yuri Dmitrievich
- 07/15/1891 - 03/19/1898 - Colonel Churin, Alexey Evgrafovich
- 03/27/1898 - 12/10/1900 - Colonel Vladimir Apollonovich Olokhov
- 07.01.1901 - 25.04.1903 - Colonel Stremoukhov, Nikolai Petrovich
- 05/20/1903 - 06/15/1907 - lieutenant colonel (from 06.12.1903 colonel) Baiov, Konstantin Konstantinovich
- 03.07.1907 - 08.05.1908 - Colonel Linda, Konstantin Pavlovich
- 05/13/1908 - 09/23/1912 - Colonel Butchik, Mikhail Mikhailovich
- 09/25/1912 - 12/10/1914 - Colonel Radus-Zenkovich, Lev Apollonovich
- 12/31/1914 - 03/19/1915 - Colonel Dreyer, Vladimir Nikolaevich von
- 05/16/1915 - 05/02/1916 - and. D. Colonel Menchukov, Evgeny Alexandrovich
- 05/02/1916 - 08/31/1916 - Colonel Cheglov, Mikhail Petrovich
- 08/31/1916 - 01/27/1917 - Colonel Vlasyev, Nikolai Ivanovich
- 02/08/1917 - 10/09/1917 - and. D. Colonel Erofeev, Grigory Kirillovich
- from 19.10.1917 - Colonel (from 21.11.1917 Major General) Gamchenko, Evgeniy Spiridonovich

== Commanders of the 1st Brigade ==
- 08/30/1873 - xx.xx, 1874 - Major General Pakhomov, Pyotr Alekseevich
- 09/12/1874 - 10/01, 1874 - Major General Nikolai Nikolayevich Malakhov
- 01.10.1874 - 22.02, 1877 - Major General Kuzmin, Ilya Alexandrovich
- 02/03/1878 - xx.xx, 1881 - Major General Alexandrov, Nikolai Ivanovich
- 06.16.1881 - 06.30.1886 - Major General Baron von Geyking, Fedor Fedorovich
- 07/03/1886 - 01/21/1889 - Major General Protsenko, Pyotr Petrovich
- 02/18/1889 - 02/25/1891 - Major General Baron Rosen, Alexander-Stepan Fridrikhovich
- 03.03.1891 - 07.10.1899 - Major General Rozhnov, Leopold Ivanovich
- October 31, 1899 - May 29, 1903 - Major General Poltorzhitsky, Joseph Suleimanovich
- June 4, 1903 - February 29, 1904 - Major General Schultz, Dmitry Lvovich
- March 2, 1904 - October 22, 1904 - Major General Alexander Ragoza
- 8 November, 1904 - 04.09, 1906 - Major General Kazakevich, Ignatiy Fedorovich
- 06.10.1906 - 17.10.1910 - Major General von Torklus, Fyodor-Emiliy-Karl Ivanovich
- 12/29/1910 - until 05/02/1913 - Major General Gursky, Ivan Ignatievich
- 1913-1914: Mikhail Sokovin
- February 8, 1914 - May 13, 1914 - Major General Palibin, Pyotr Pavlovich
- July 7, 1914 - July 29, 1914 - Major General Yanovsky, Nikolai Kirillovich
