= Arkady Stolypin =

Russian General (1822–1899)

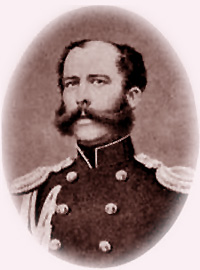
- Birth name: Arkady Dmitrievich Stolypin
- Born: 1822
- Died: 1899 (aged 76–77)
- Allegiance: Russian Empire
- Branch: Imperial Russian Army
- Commands: 9th Army Corps
- Battles / wars: Crimean War

Arkady Dmitrievich Stolypin (Russian: Арка́дий Дми́триевич Столы́пин; 1822–1899) was an Imperial Russian general of artillery, governor of Eastern Rumelia and commandant of the Kremlin Palace guard. He was the father of Pyotr Stolypin. His second wife was Natalia Mikhailovna Stolypina (née Gorchakova), the daughter of Prince Mikhail Dmitrievich Gorchakov, the Commanding general of the Russian infantry during the Crimean War and later the governor general of Warsaw.

== Sources ==
Preceded by	Commander of the 9th Army Corps; 1878–1886	Succeeded by
