= Myers Foggin =

Myers Foggin (23 December 1908 – 1986) was an English concert pianist and conductor. Born in Newcastle-upon-Tyne, England. He studied at the Royal Academy of Music in London from 1927–1932. His teachers included the composer York Bowen.

== Professional career ==
Soon after completion of his studies, Foggin was appointed Professor of Pianoforte at the Royal Academy (1936–49), later also holding the post of Director of Opera (1948–65). He was Warden of the Royal Academy from 1949–65.

Foggin's international concert pianist career included appearances in Paris, Rome, Naples, Palermo, Malta and Algiers. He appeared frequently in concert in the United Kingdom, and he made several recordings as a pianist for Decca. These include Charles Villiers Stanford's Clarinet Sonata in F major, Op. 129 with Frederick Thurston, to whom Stanford rededicated the work, Brahms’ Sonata in E flat major, Op. 120, No. 2 for clarinet and piano (also with Thurston), and Brahms' Songs for Voice, Viola and Piano, Op. 91, in which he and the viola virtuoso Max Gilbert, a colleague at the Royal Academy, accompanied the Liverpool-born contralto Nancy Evans. Together with Watson Forbes (viola) he recorded two works by Richard Henry Walthew (1872–1951) – the Sonata in D for Viola and Piano and A Mosaic in Four Parts. He accompanied the Russian tenor Vladimir Rosing on a Parlophone album of songs by Mussorgsky released in late 1934.

Foggin undertook a tour of Czechoslovakia in September 1946 together with the cellist David Ffrangcon-Thomas performing cello sonatas by British and Czech composers. During the tour he also broadcast a specially arranged programme of British piano works from Prague.

Foggin was guest conductor of several leading Italian orchestras in addition to holding several appointments in the UK, where he conducted the People's Palace Choral Society (1936–49) and Croydon Philharmonic Society (1957–73), and he was musical director at the Toynbee Hall from 1946–49. He was appointed Principal of Trinity College of Music and was Chairman of the Royal Philharmonic Society from 1968 and President of the National Federation of Music Societies from 1967–72. Foggin was guest conductor with the Carl Rosa Opera, Sadler's Wells Opera and the BBC. He was awarded a CBE, and died in Chichester in 1986.
