= Nikolay Kridener =

Nikolai von Krüdener
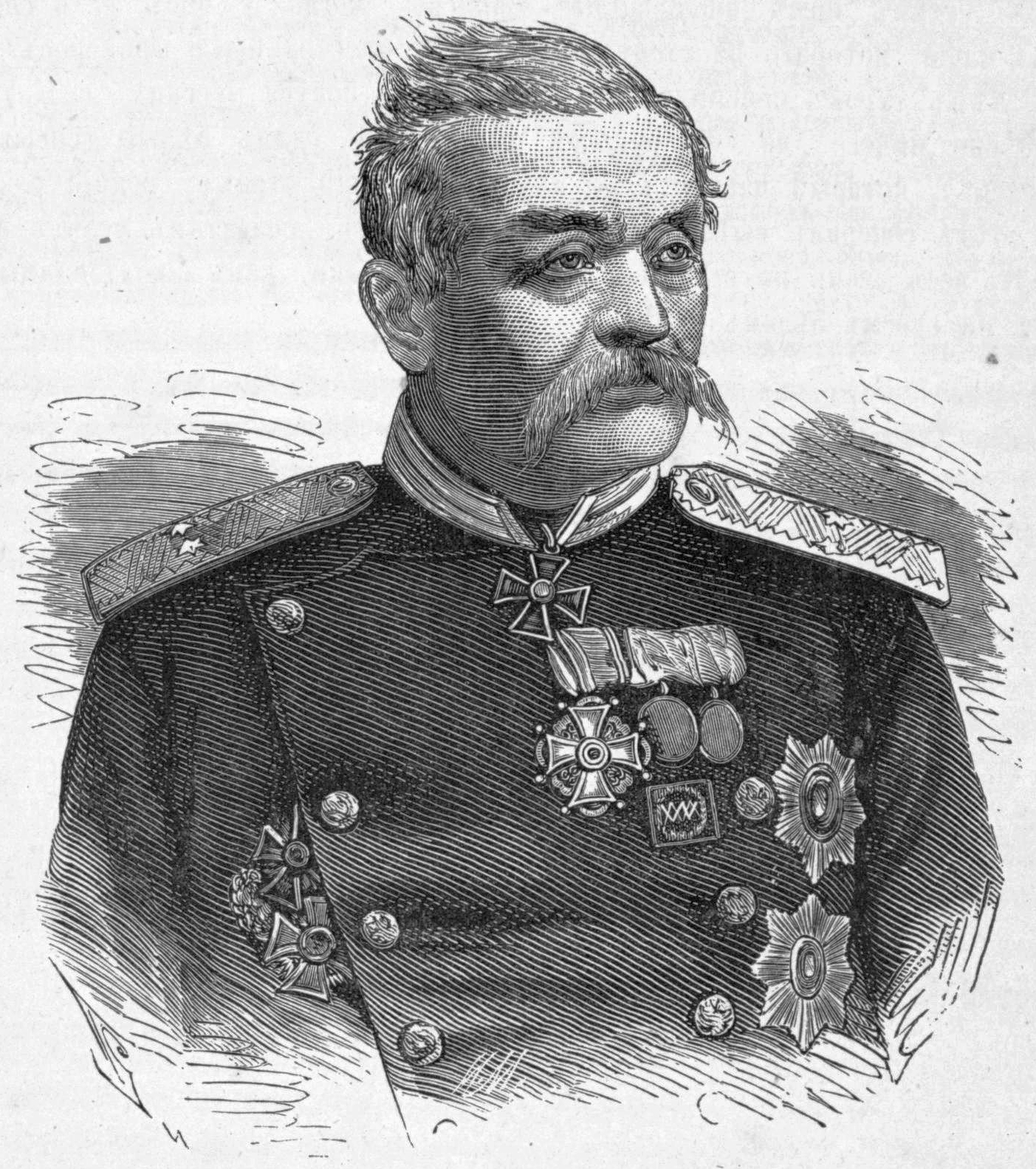
- Born: 10 March 1811; Governorate of Livonia, Russian Empire
- Died: 17 February 1891 (aged 79); Moscow, Russian Empire
- Other name: Nikolay Kridener
- Military career
- Allegiance: Russian Empire
- Branch: Imperial Russian Army
- Service years: 1828–1891
- Rank: General of the Infantry
- Commands: 27th Infantry Division; 9th Army Corps
- Conflicts: January Uprising; Russo-Turkish War
- Awards: Order of St. George; Order of St. Vladimir; Order of Saint Anna; Order of Prince Danilo I

Nikolai Karl Gregor Freiherr von Krüdener (Nikolay Pavlovich Kridener; Николай Павлович Криденер; 10 March 1811 – 17 February 1891) was a Baltic German infantry general. He graduated from the Nikolayevskoye Engineering Academy in 1828 and upon graduation was appointed officer. In 1833 he entered the Imperial Military Academy and after graduation was general staff of the army where he was in charge of various administrative duties. In 1848 he took command of the regiment Prince Eugene of Württemberg. In 1858 he was commander of the Keksgolm grenadier regiment. Promoted major general in 1859, he took command of the Volyn Imperial Russian Guard Regiment.

He was in command of the 9th Army corps during the Russo-Turkish War of 1877–1878 and conquered the city of Nikopol on July 16, 1877 (O.S. July 4), for which he was awarded the Order of Saint George, 3rd class. Thereafter he was in command of the Russian forces during the first battle of Plevna on July 8–18, 1877 where he was defeated. He then participated in the siege of Plevna.

After the war he was in charge of the military forces in Warsaw. He died in 1891.

Preceded by Office created	Commander of the 27th Infantry Division; 1863–1876	Succeeded by
Preceded by Office created	Commander of the 9th Army Corps; 1876–1877	Succeeded by

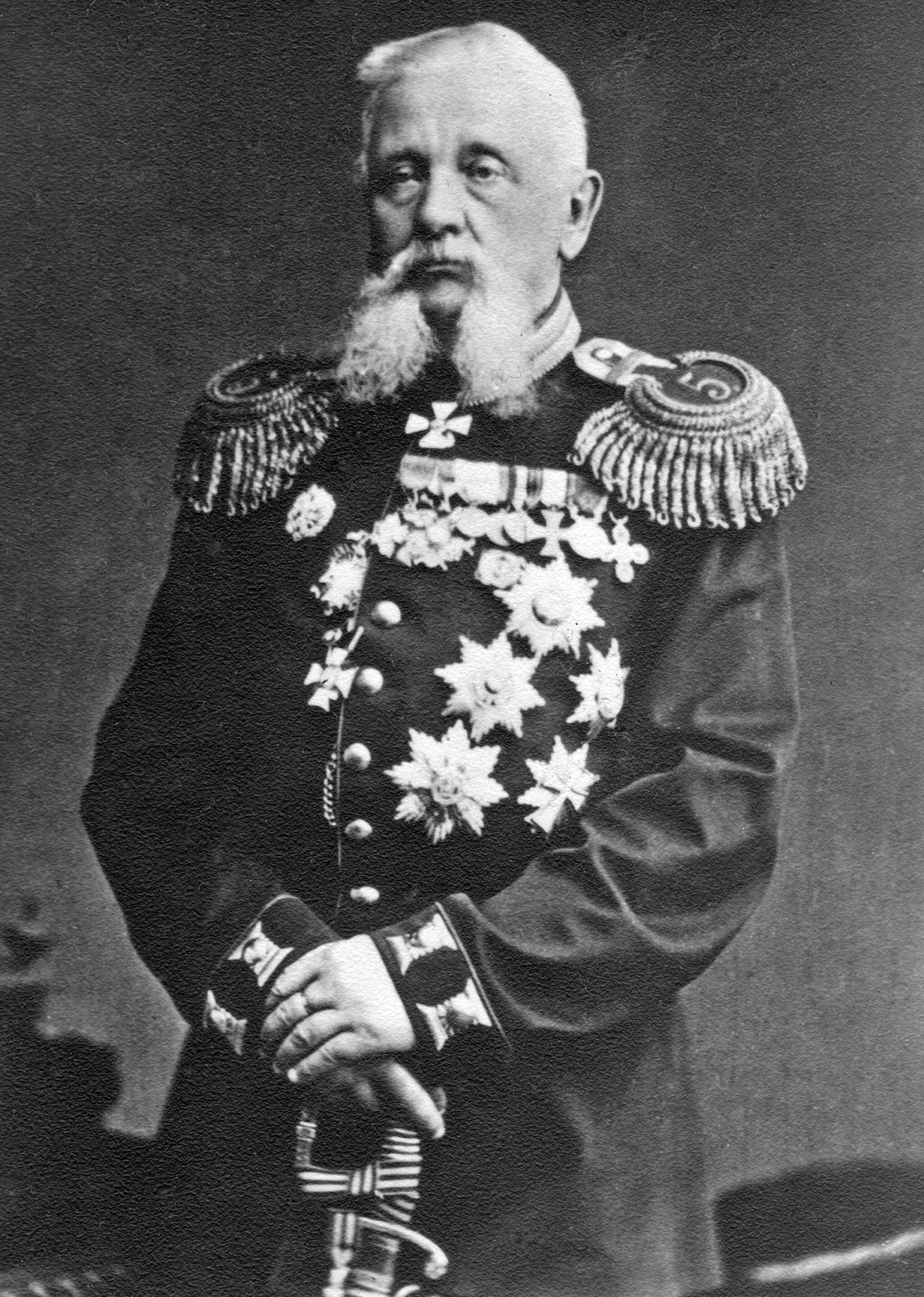
Nicolai von Kruedener Generalgouverneur von Polen
