= Grade I and II* listed buildings in the London Borough of Wandsworth =

There are over 9,000 Grade I listed buildings and 20,000 Grade II* listed buildings in England. This page is a list of these buildings in the London Borough of Wandsworth.

== Grade I ==
Name	Location	Type	Completed (Note: The date given is the date used by Historic England as significant for the initial building or that of an important part in the structure's description.)	Date designated	Grid ref. (Note: The grid reference is based on the British national grid reference system, sometimes known as OSGB36, used by the Ordnance Survey.) Geo-coordinates	Entry number (Note: The "List Entry Number" is a unique number assigned to each listed building and scheduled monument by Historic England.)	Image
Church of St Mary and Churchyard Wall and Gates	Battersea, Wandsworth	Church	1775–77	28 June 1954	TQ2680676866; 51°28′36″N 0°10′32″W	1357626	Church of St Mary and Churchyard Wall and Gates More images
Gala Bingo Club (Granada Cinema)	Tooting, Wandsworth	Bingo Hall	1931	28 June 1972	TQ2752071310; 51°25′35″N 0°10′02″W	1357668	Gala Bingo Club (Granada Cinema) More images
Mount Clare	Wandsworth	House	1772	14 July 1955	TQ2162374004; 51°27′07″N 0°15′04″W	1184436	Mount Clare More images
Parkstead House	Roehampton University, Roehampton Lane, Wandsworth	House	1760	14 July 1955	TQ2216773650; 51°26′55″N 0°14′36″W	1357675	Parkstead House More images
Roehampton House (at Queen Mary's Hospital)	Roehampton, Wandsworth	House	1710–12	23 October 1978	TQ2221074260; 51°27′15″N 0°14′33″W	1357694	Roehampton House (at Queen Mary's Hospital) More images

== Grade II* ==
Name	Location	Type	Completed	Date designated	Grid ref. Geo-coordinates	Entry number	Image
Albert Bridge	Wandsworth	Suspension Bridge	1873	8 February 1975	TQ2741277472; 51°28′55″N 0°10′00″W	1065576	Albert Bridge More images
Battersea Arts Centre (formerly Battersea Town Hall)	Clapham, Wandsworth	Assembly Hall	1892	13 February 1970	TQ2785775629; 51°27′55″N 0°09′39″W	1184293	Battersea Arts Centre (formerly Battersea Town Hall) More images
Battersea Power Station	Wandsworth	Power station	1937–1941	14 October 1980	TQ2894577506; 51°28′55″N 0°08′40″W	1357620	Battersea Power Station More images
Binley House	Wandsworth	Flats	1955–1958	22 December 1998	TQ2201474194; 51°27′13″N 0°14′43″W	1246040	Binley House More images
Charcot House	Wandsworth	Flats	1955–1958	22 December 1998	TQ2187174207; 51°27′13″N 0°14′51″W	1246043	Charcot House
All Saints' Church, Putney Common	Wandsworth	Church	1874	26 February 1976	TQ2313075730; 51°28′02″N 0°13′44″W	1065542	All Saints' Church, Putney Common More images
All Saints Church, Wandsworth	Wandsworth	Church	1630	14 July 1955	TQ2547574720; 51°27′27″N 0°11′43″W	1357684	All Saints Church, Wandsworth More images
Church of Holy Trinity	Roehampton, Wandsworth	Church	1896 TO 1898	14 July 1955	TQ2259573720; 51°26′57″N 0°14′14″W	1357671	Church of Holy Trinity More images
St Anne's Church, Wandsworth	Wandsworth	Parish Church	1820-4	14 July 1955	TQ2603174446; 51°27′18″N 0°11′15″W	1065485	St Anne's Church, Wandsworth More images
Church of St Luke	Wandsworth	Church	1883	7 April 1983	TQ2817674205; 51°27′08″N 0°09′24″W	1065521	Church of St Luke More images
Church of St Mark	Wandsworth	Anglican Church	1872-4	28 June 1954	TQ2721475088; 51°27′38″N 0°10′13″W	1065551	Church of St Mark More images
St. Mary's Church, Putney	Wandsworth	Church	15th century	14 July 1955	TQ2415675601; 51°27′57″N 0°12′51″W	1065519	St. Mary's Church, Putney More images
Church of St Paul	Wimbledon Park, Wandsworth	Church	1888–1896	14 July 1955	TQ2389873076; 51°26′35″N 0°13′07″W	1065578	Church of St Paul More images
Church of the Ascension, Lavender Hill	Clapham, Wandsworth	Church	1876–83	28 June 1954	TQ2809675666; 51°27′56″N 0°09′26″W	1065541	Church of the Ascension, Lavender Hill More images
Church Row, 1–6, Wandsworth Plain SW18	Wandsworth	House	c. 1723	14 July 1955	TQ2551974730; 51°27′28″N 0°11′41″W	1183550	Church Row, 1–6, Wandsworth Plain SW18 More images
Cremorne Bridge, West London Extension Railway Bridge, Battersea	Wandsworth	Railway Bridge	1863	26 November 2008	TQ2661876442; 51°28′22″N 0°10′42″W	1393005	Cremorne Bridge, West London Extension Railway Bridge, Battersea More images
Denmead House	Wandsworth	Flats	1955–1958	22 December 1998	TQ2180274216; 51°27′14″N 0°14′54″W	1246044	Denmead House
Devonshire House including Railings and Gates, 44 Vicarage Crescent	Wandsworth	House	Early 18th century	28 June 1954	TQ2678676645; 51°28′28″N 0°10′33″W	1357666	Devonshire House including Railings and Gates, 44 Vicarage Crescent More images
Dixcote	Wandsworth	House	1897	7 April 1983	TQ2917371793; 51°25′50″N 0°08′36″W	1065512	Upload Photo
Downshire House	Roehampton, Wandsworth	House	c. 1770	14 July 1955	TQ2208874120; 51°27′10″N 0°14′40″W	1065522	Downshire House More images
Dunbridge House	Wandsworth	Flats	1955–1958	22 December 1998	TQ2173474225; 51°27′14″N 0°14′58″W	1246042	Dunbridge House
Granada Theatre, Clapham Junction (former Granada Theatre, former Gala Bingo Hall)	St John's Hill, Clapham Junction	Cafe	1937	1 May 1998	TQ2699675264; 51°27′44″N 0°10′24″W	1119730	Granada Theatre, Clapham Junction (former Granada Theatre, former Gala Bingo Hall) More images
Former Royal Victoria Patriotic School	Wandsworth	Courtyard	1857-9	3 October 1973	TQ2693474283; 51°27′12″N 0°10′28″W	1065496	Former Royal Victoria Patriotic School More images
Grove House	Roehampton, Wandsworth	House	1777	14 July 1955	TQ2198274367; 51°27′19″N 0°14′45″W	1065523	Grove House More images
Lyne-Stephens Mausoleum	Roehampton, Wandsworth	Mausoleum	1864	7 April 1983	TQ2212874347; 51°27′18″N 0°14′38″W	1184736	Lyne-Stephens Mausoleum More images
Old Battersea House, 30 Vicarage Crescent	Wandsworth	House	c. 1699	28 June 1954	TQ2674776575; 51°28′26″N 0°10′35″W	1065500	Old Battersea House, 30 Vicarage Crescent More images
Ram (Youngs) Brewery Complex	Wandsworth	Brewery	Late 18th century	14 July 1955	TQ2565174685; 51°27′26″N 0°11′34″W	1065461	Ram (Youngs) Brewery Complex More images
'Single Form (Memorial)'	Battersea Park	Memorial		19 January 2016	TQ2837576995; 51°28′38″N 0°09′10″W	1430770	'Single Form (Memorial)' More images
Tomb of Robert Wood, Putney Old Burial Ground	Putney Old Burial Ground	Table Tomb	LATER 18th century	7 April 1983	TQ2370575121; 51°27′42″N 0°13′15″W	1065497	Tomb of Robert Wood, Putney Old Burial Ground More images
Temple in Grounds of Mount Clare	Wandsworth	Garden Temple	1762–69	14 June 1955	TQ2170673855; 51°27′02″N 0°15′00″W	1065545	Upload Photo
The Bull at Foot of Downshire Field Alton Estate	Daneburry Avenue, Roehampton, London SW15	Sculpture	1961	15 April 1998	TQ2183874029; 51°27′08″N 0°14′53″W	1376742	The Bull at Foot of Downshire Field Alton Estate More images
War Memorial of the 24th East Surrey Division, Battersea Park	Battersea Park, Wandsworth	War Memorial	1924	24 August 2005	TQ2829677344; 51°28′50″N 0°09′14″W	1391503	War Memorial of the 24th East Surrey Division, Battersea Park More images
Winchfield House and Abutting Chimney	Wandsworth	Flats	1955–1958	22 December 1998	TQ2193874196; 51°27′13″N 0°14′47″W	1246041	Winchfield House and Abutting Chimney
174 and 176 East Hill, SW18	170 East Hill, Wandsworth Town, SW18 2HD	House	c. 1736	14 July 1955	TQ2598474708; 51°27′26″N 0°11′17″W	1357641	174 and 176 East Hill, SW18

== See also ==
- Grade II listed buildings in the London Borough of Wandsworth
