= Granada Cinema, Woolwich =

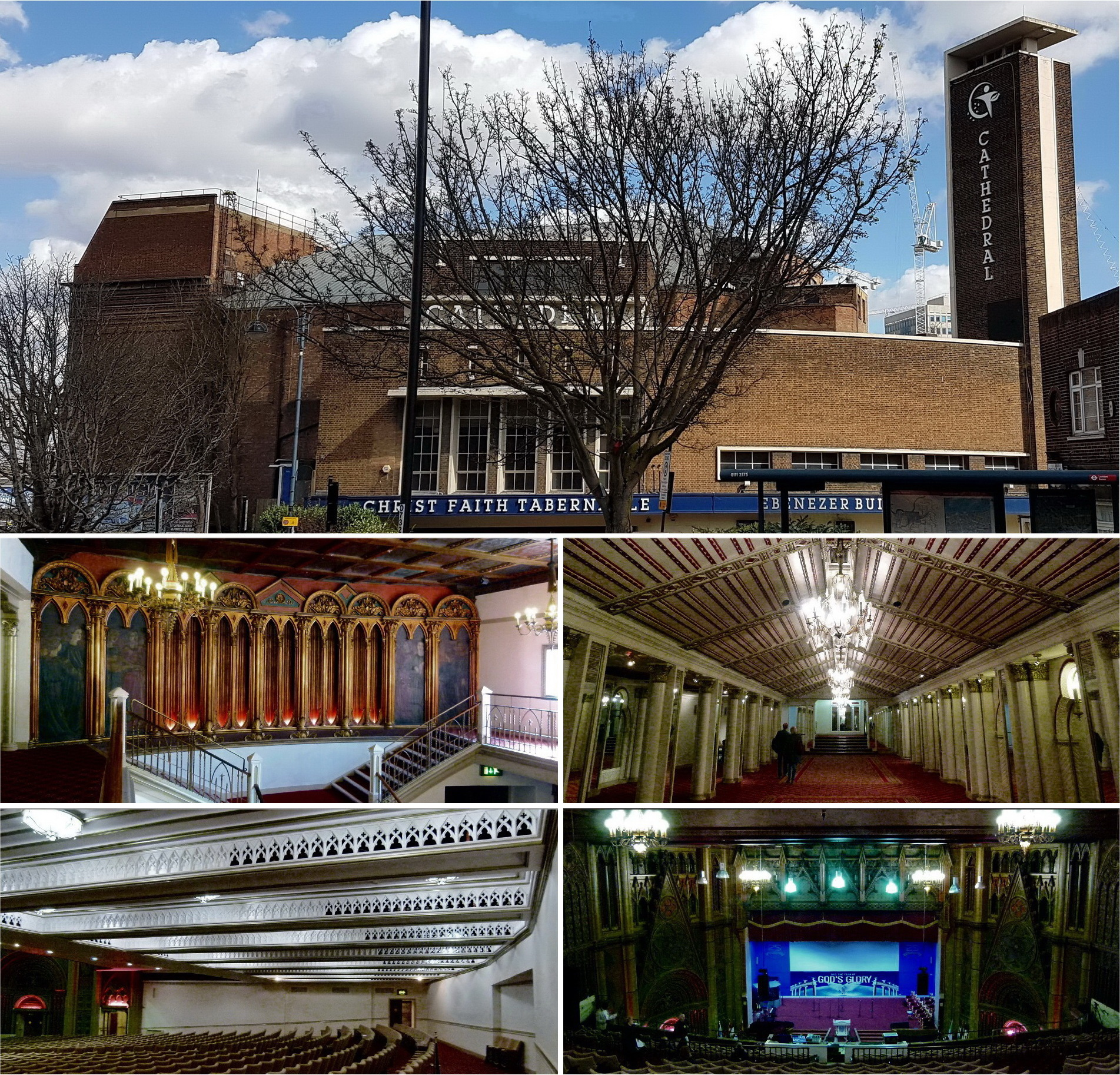
- Interactive map of the Granada Cinema, Woolwich area

General information
- Type: Former cinema, now a church
- Architectural style: Modernism
- Location: 174–186 Powis Street / Woolwich High Street, Woolwich (SE18)
- Coordinates: 51°29′35.8″N 0°03′42.87″E
- Construction started: 1936
- Inaugurated: 20 April 1937

Dimensions
- Other dimensions: 48 × 28ft (stage)

Design and construction
- Architects: Cecil Massey, Reginald Uren
- Other designers: Theodore Komisarjevsky

Other information
- Seating capacity: 2,434

The former Granada Cinema, also known as the Ebenezer Building or Cathedral of Christ Faith Tabernacle, in Woolwich, south-east London, was built as a large and luxurious cinema in the 1930s. It had a seating capacity of nearly 2500 and is now being used as a church hall. The building with its extravagantly decorated interior is a Grade II* listed building.

== History ==
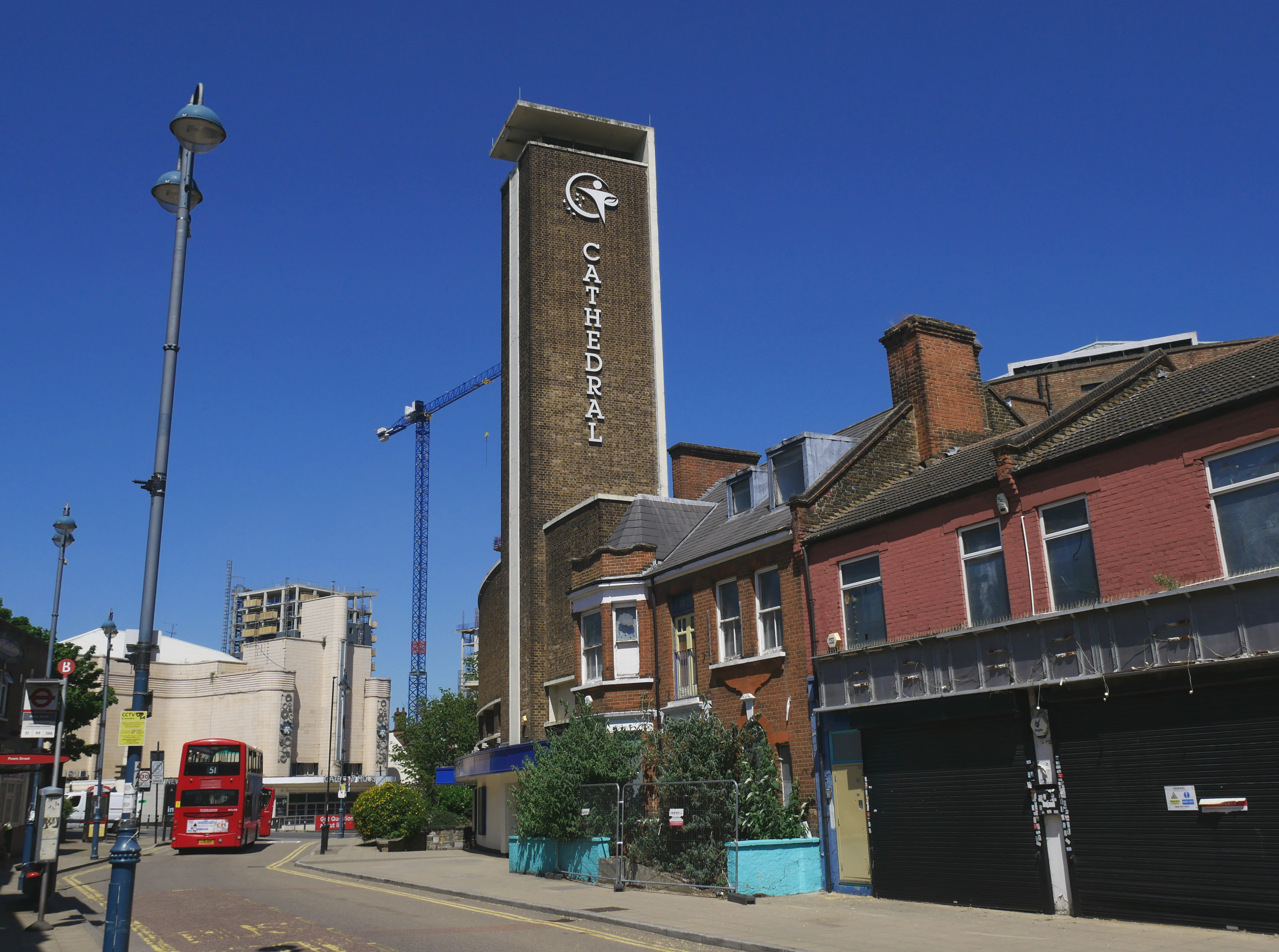
The south face of Woolwich's Granada Cinema

In the early 20th century, Woolwich was a thriving industrial and military town. In the mid-1930s there were several smaller movie theatres operating in Woolwich, when two leading companies in the business, Sidney Bernstein's Granada and Oscar Deutsch's Odeon, decided more or less simultaneously to establish large cinemas in the town. The first of the two to open in 1937 was the Granada Cinema; the Odeon opened four months later, just across the road.

Granada by this time had a track record for building Britain's most glamorous cinemas. In Woolwich however, Cecil Masey (1881–1960) and Reginald Uren (1903–1988) built an outwardly rather severe theatre, but with a lavish interior by Russian-born designer Theodore Komisarjevsky (1882–1954). The builders, Bovis Ltd, started work in 1936 after the west end of Powis Street had been widened. It opened on 20 April 1937 with Good Morning, Boys and Lady Be Careful. Special guests at the opening ceremony were American actress Glenda Farrell and British comic actor Claude Hulbert.

Initially the Granada Cinema mainly showed ABC or Gaumont films but after ABC built their own Regal Cinema in Woolwich in 1955, the Granada was left to play Gaumont and independent releases. The theatre regularly played host to Christmas pantomimes and musical acts like Buddy Holly in 1958 and Roy Orbison with the Beatles in their famous 1963 tour.

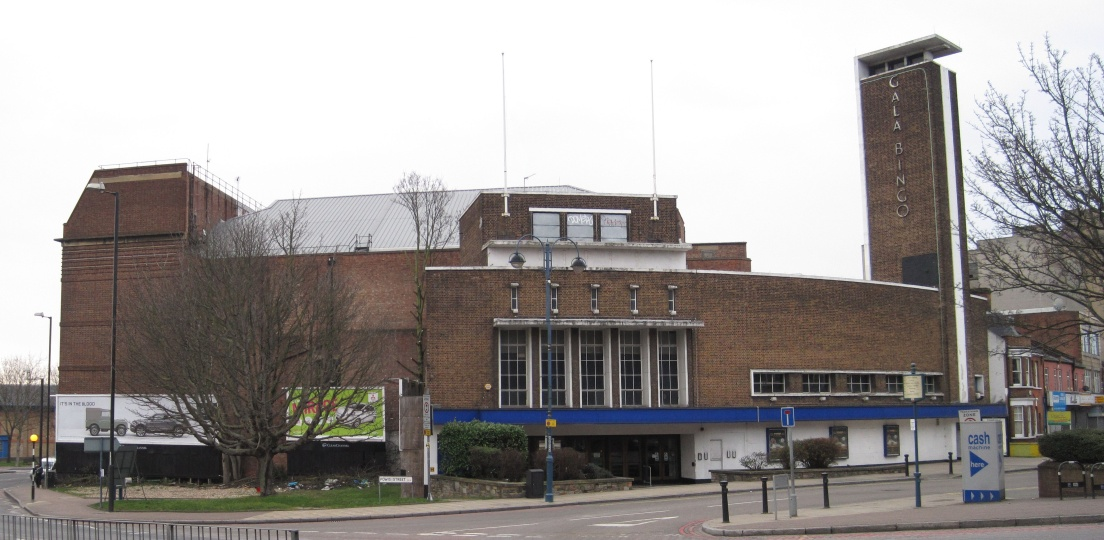
The building as a Gala bingo hall

By the early 1960s the cinema was already in decline. On weekdays it was used for playing bingo and in 1966 it became a full-time bingo hall. The bingo hall was first operated by Granada and from 1991 until 2011 by Gala. The large Wurlitzer theatre organ, which had been played by Reginald Dixon, was removed in 1996 and sold to the village hall in Tywyn, Wales. In 2011 the building was bought by Christ Faith Tabernacle Churches, a Pentecostal church founded in 1989 by the Nigerian preacher Alfred Williams. Where possible, the interior has been restored meticulously, new doors were made by the same company that made them in 1937, light fittings were commissioned to match the original lights, and new carpets match the 1930s design. The building, now known as the "Ebenezer Building" or "Cathedral" of Christ Faith Tabernacle, has been a Grade II listed building since 1973. Since 2000 its status was upgraded to Grade II*.

== The building ==
=== Exterior ===
The first designs of the Woolwich Granada by Masey had the appearance of a classical movie theatre. After Uren was appointed as co-architect the design became much more modernist and rather Dudok-like. The layout on the awkward plot of land on the junction of Powis Street and Woolwich High Street resulted in what are essentially two joined buildings. The main hall is a brown brick block along Woolwich High Street, for which Masey had intended a relief with the name of the cinema. This part was originally hidden by another building. The elegantly curved asymmetrical front on Powis Street houses the vestibule with the former box office and the foyers, previously with a café-restaurant. Above the main entrance are five tall windows under a canopy and five more narrow windows above the canopy. To the right are five windows in a concrete frame that form a horizontal bar. The advertising tower originally had a full-height appendage that was neon-lit at night. At the top, an open area under a flat roof originally formed part of the illumination.

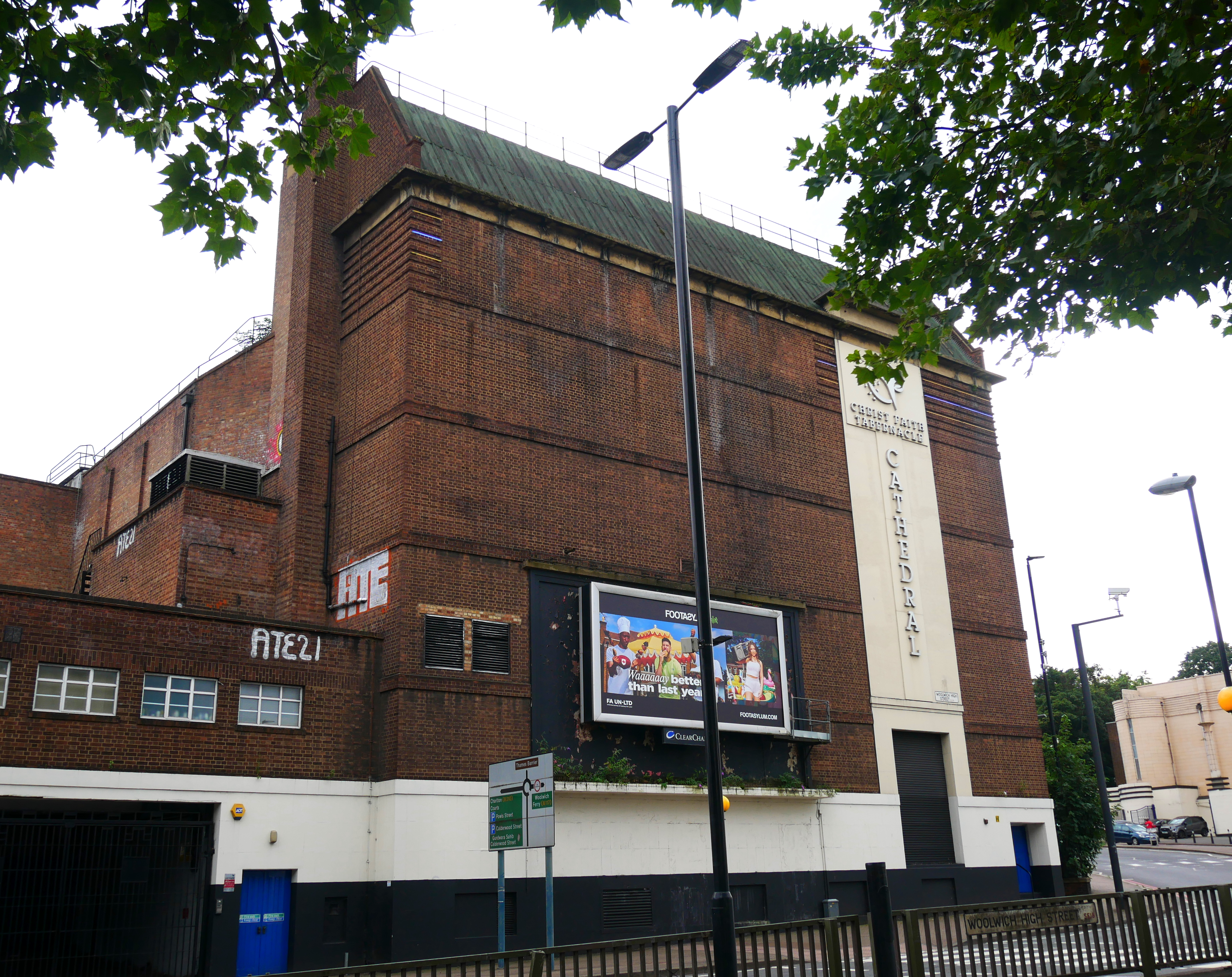
Woolwich High Street façade

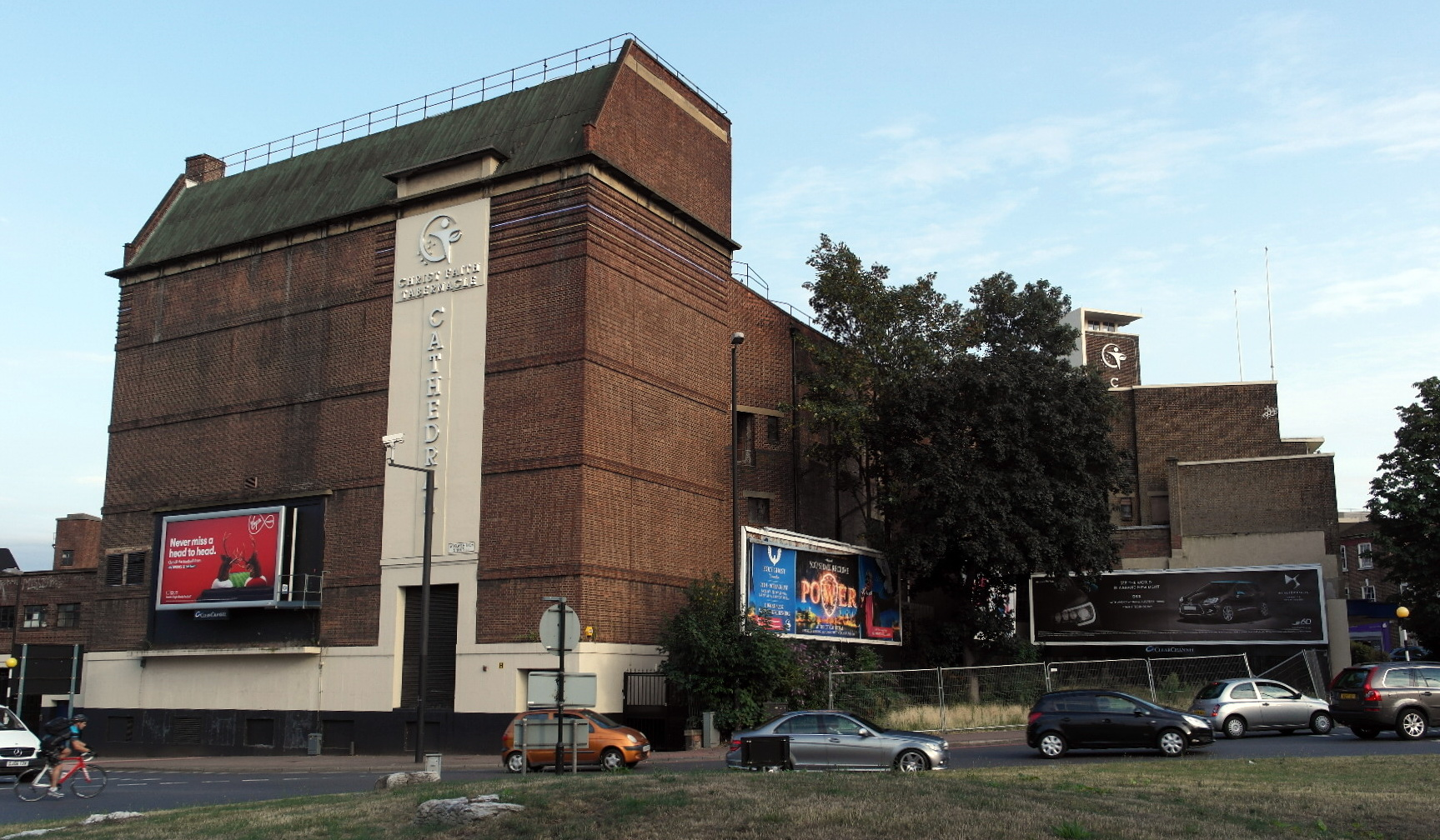
Woolwich High Street façade

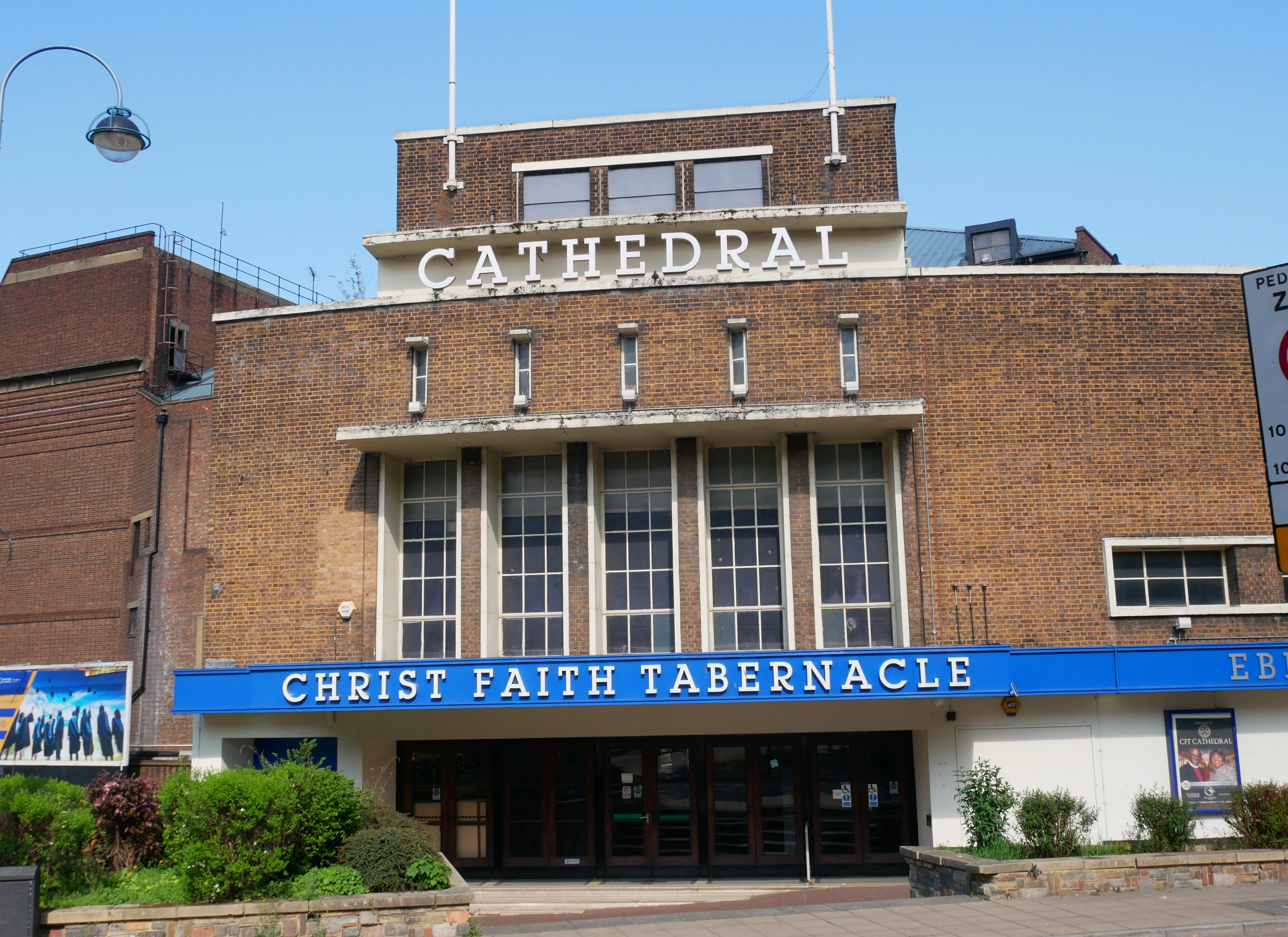
Powis Street entrance

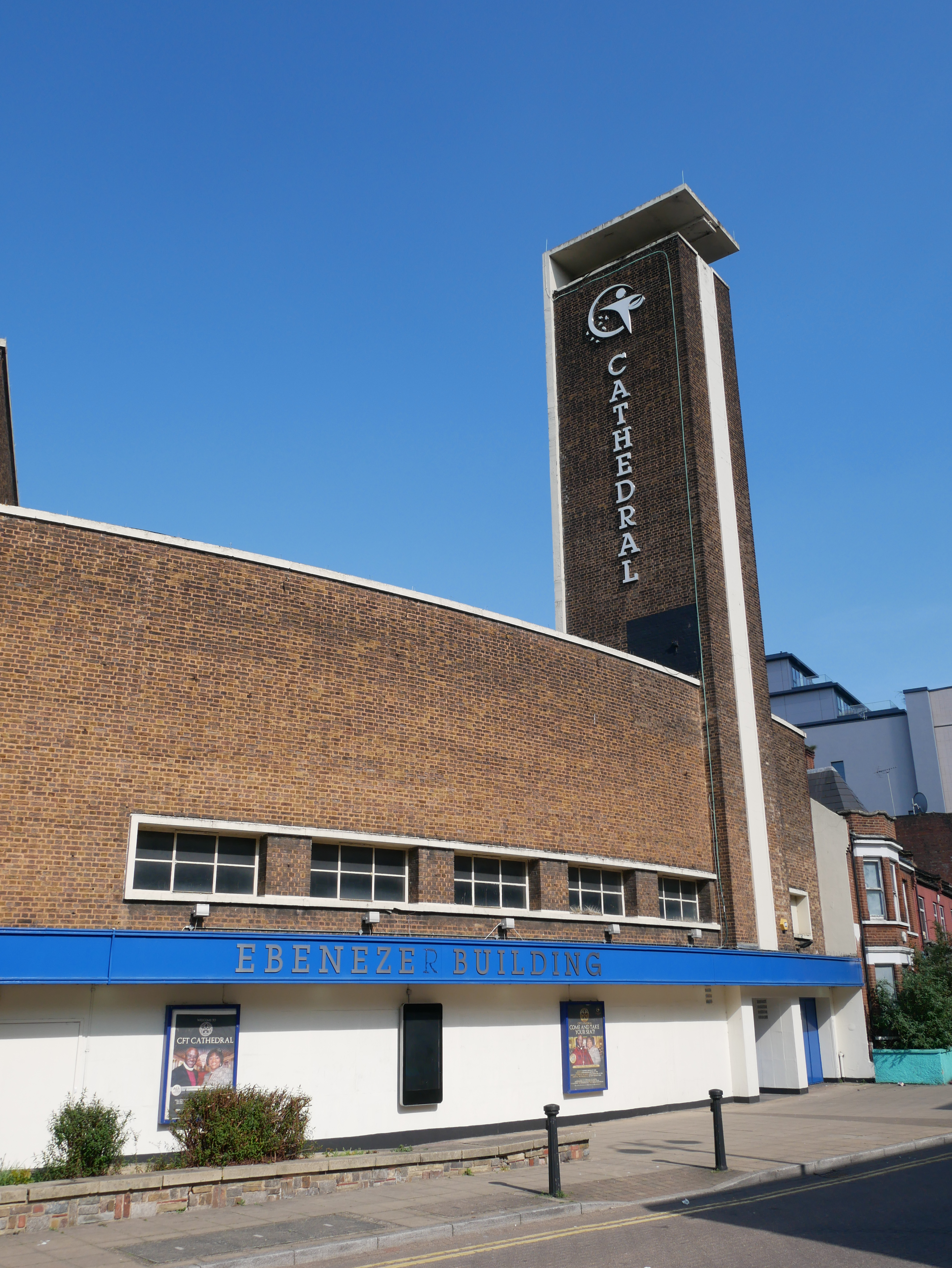
Advertising tower

=== Interior ===
The Gothic-inspired interior makes a strong contrast with the modern exterior. Together with the Tooting Granada interior, it belongs to the most elaborate purpose-built cinemas in the UK. It has been described as "reproducing the style and ambiance of a cathedral, a combination and distillation of Venetian Renaissance and Spanish Gothic, with distinct echoes of the Doge's Palace and the cathedral of Burgos". At the time, the Architect & Building News wrote that it had "a complexity and lavish exuberance rare even in cinema decoration". The opening brochure called it "the most romantic theatre ever built". The seating capacity in 1937 was 2434. After closing as a cinema, the building was used as a bingo hall and a church, but the interior has been largely preserved. The main stalls and balcony seating, which was removed in the 1960s, was replaced in 2013.

Five sets of entrance doors lead into the vestibule, decorated with pilasters. Three sets of doors with wrought-iron bars and cast-iron handles lead into the double-height foyer with galleries on three sides. The foyer has a coffered ceiling, a large central chandelier, four smaller ones and six pairs of wall lights, all in Gothic style. On the far side, a grand staircase leads to the galleries and the balcony seating area. The back wall is entirely panelled with gilded frames with rounded and pointed arches. The four outer bays are decorated with figures painted in Italian Renaissance style, probably by Vladmir Polunin (1880–1957).

The auditorium is also in a style partly based on Medieval and Renaissance architecture. It has elaborate coffered ceilings in red and green and five large chandeliers. The imposing ante-proscenium is divided into three sections, separated by pilasters. The central feature is a monumental Romanesque style arch with jambs made up of seven columns and a tympanum extending up into a pointed gable. The upper stages of the ante-proscenium are made up of Gothic gables and rows of niches and trefoils. Some panels are painted with representations of lions and unicorns (possibly also by Polunin).

The balcony foyer ("Hall of Mirrors") features trefoil-arched mirrors and mirror-faced pilasters on both sides of the elongated space. It has a pitched ceiling with fabric-like decorations in white, red and gold, and a row of French "teardrop" chandeliers. The balcony is reached through entrances with Gothic panelling, and on the other side, by two vomitories.

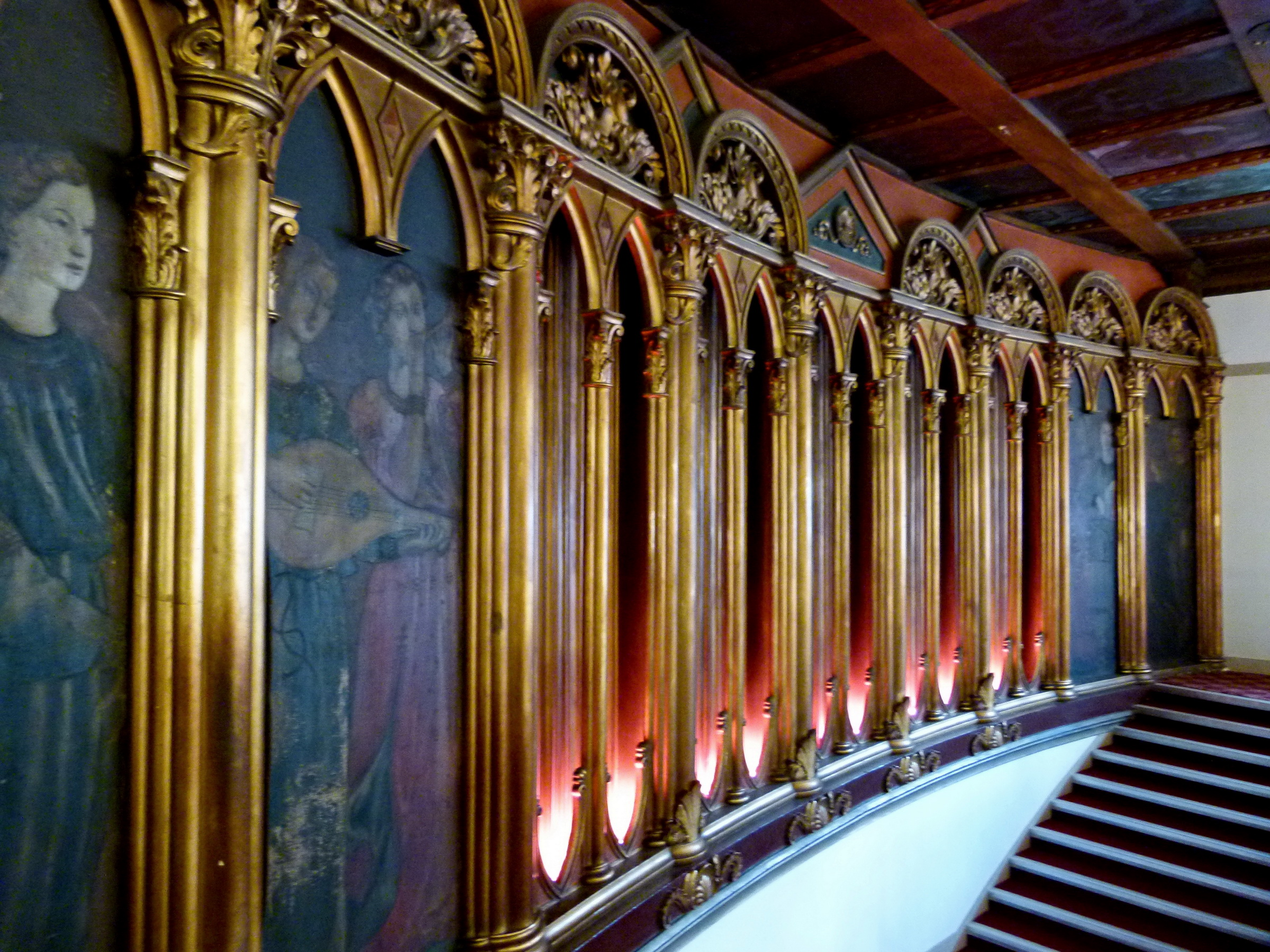
Detail grand staircase

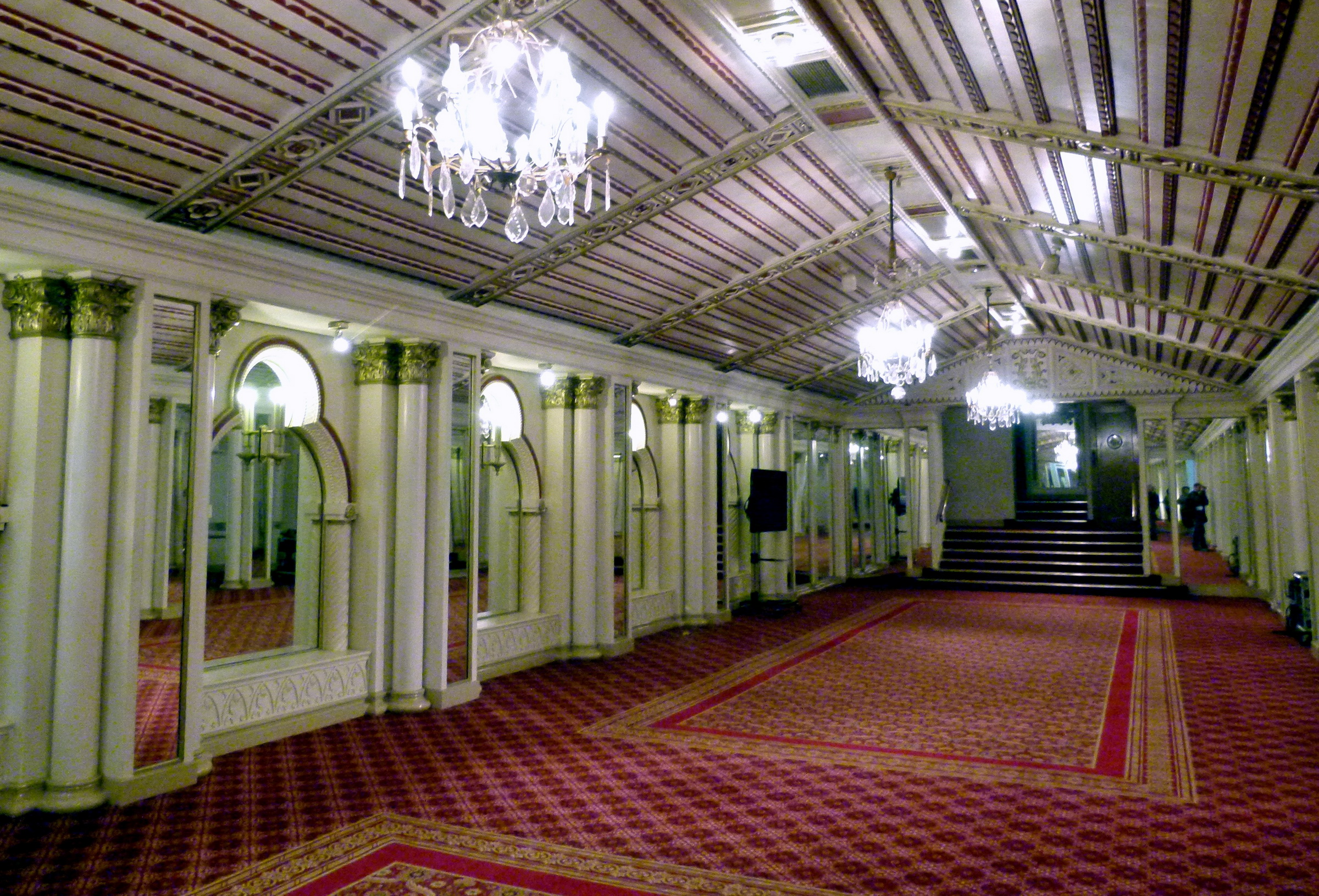
Hall of Mirrors

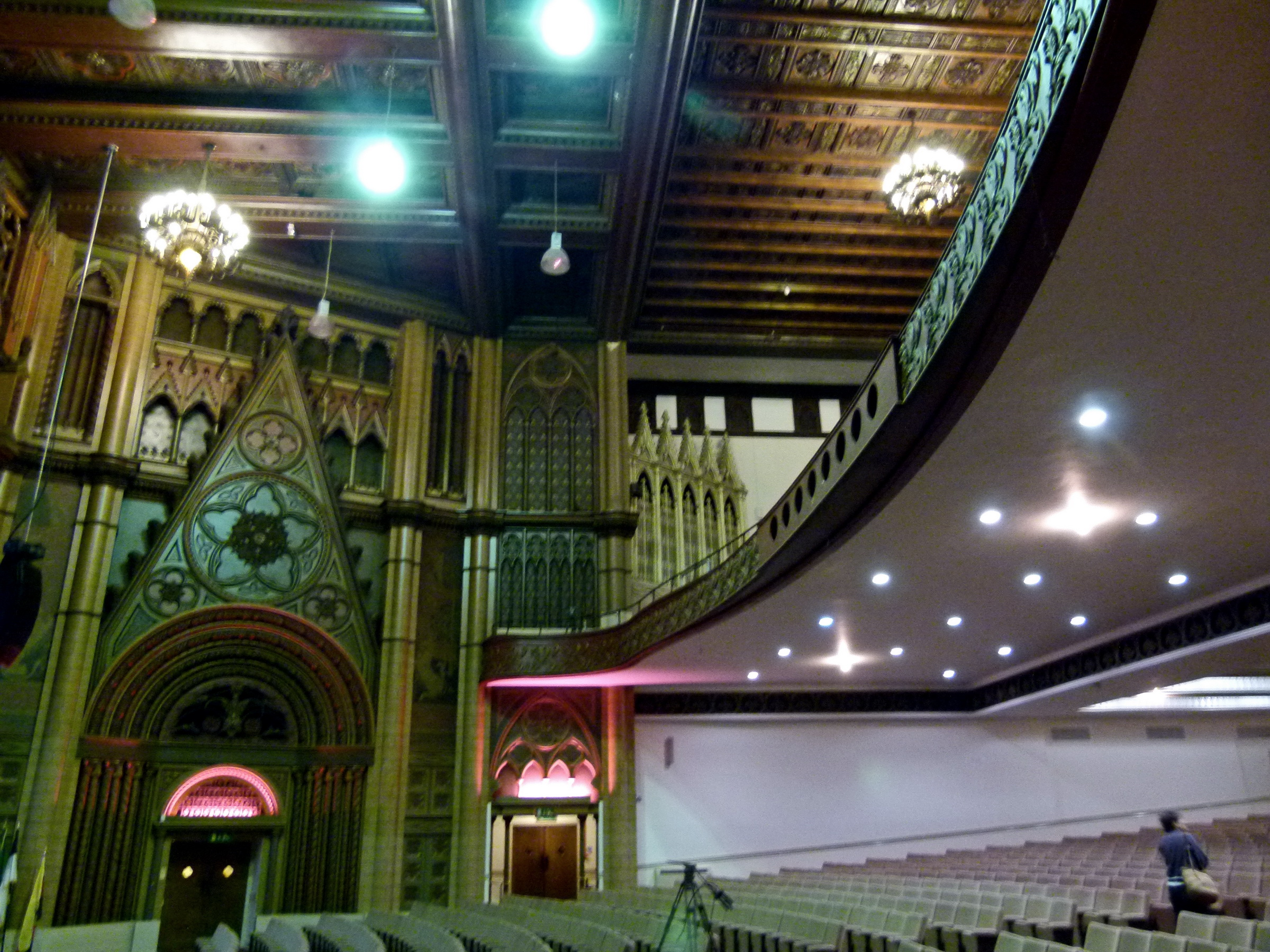
Main hall

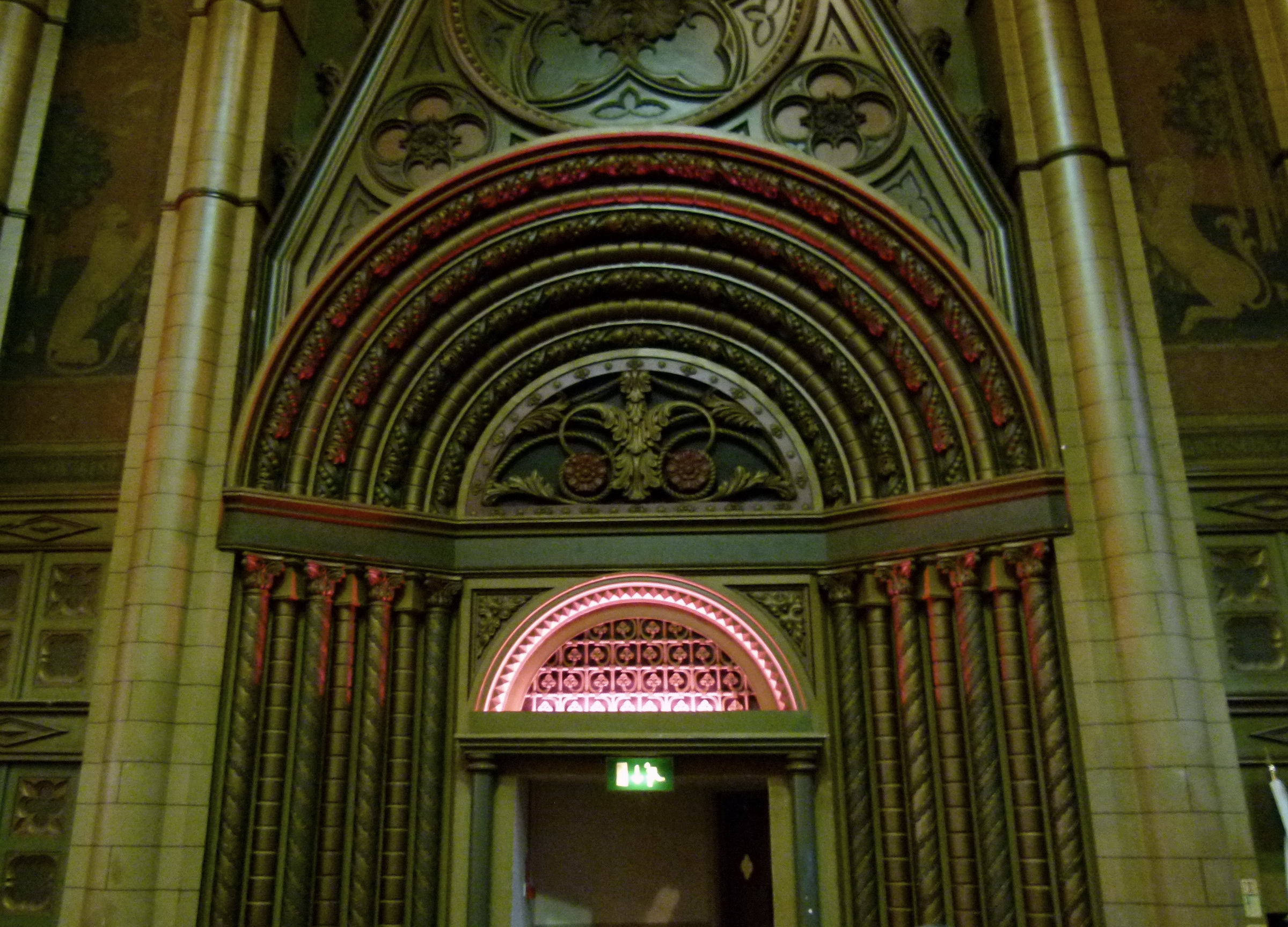
Detail main hall

== See also ==
- Granada, Tooting
- New Wine Church (the former Odeon or Coronet Cinema)

== Bibliography ==
- Eyles, Allen, The Granada Theatres, Cinema Theatre Association, 1998
- Powell, Rob, 'Woolwich Granada: “The most romantic theatre ever built”', article on www.greenwich.co.uk, 20 October 2013 (online text)
- Richards, Jeffrey, The Age of the Dream Palace: Cinema and Society in 1930s Britain, Routledge & Kegan Paul, London, 1984 (online text)
- Saint, A., Guillery, P. (ed.), Woolwich – Survey of London, Volume 48, Yale Books, London, 2012 (online text Chapter 1)
- 'Listed building 1212651' on website historicengland.org.uk
