= Reginald Uren =

New Zealand architect working in United Kingdom (1906–1988)

Reginald Harold Uren
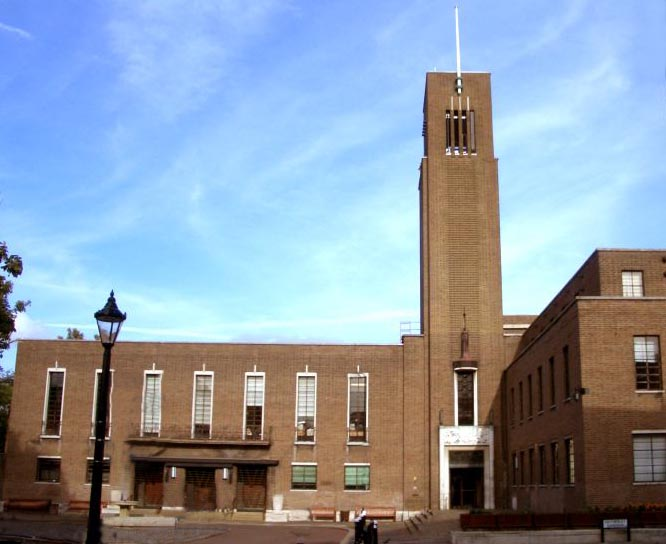
- Hornsey Town Hall, 1933: Uren's first major commission
- Born: 5 March 1906; Petone, North Island, New Zealand
- Died: 17 February 1988 (aged 81); Newmarket, New Zealand
- Occupation: Architect
- Awards: RIBA London Architecture Medal, 1935 (awarded 1936); New Zealand Institute of Architects Award of Merit, 1965
- Practice: Slater, Uren and Pike; later Slater and Uren
- Buildings: Hornsey Town Hall, Granada Cinema in Woolwich, Sanderson Building

Reginald Harold Uren FRIBA (5 March 1906 – 17 February 1988) was a New Zealand-born architect who worked in the United Kingdom for most of his career.

== Life and work ==
Uren was born in the Belfast area of Christchurch, South Island on 5 March 1906, the son of Richard Ellis Uren and Christina Uren. He qualified as an architect in New Zealand in 1929, before moving to Britain to further his career. Uren worked in the engine room of steamer as a greaser to secure passage to Britain. He married Dorothy Morgan in 1930 and the couple had one daughter.

In Britain, Uren briefly studied architecture at the Bartlett School, University College London and under Charles Holden. He became an Associate Member of the Royal Institute of British Architects in 1931.

In 1933, he won the architectural competition to design Hornsey Town Hall against a field of 281 entries. The town hall was his first major commission in Britain and one of the first large modernist designs constructed in the country, showing influences of Dutch and Swedish architecture of the period. The design was well received and Uren was awarded the RIBA London Architecture Medal for 1935.

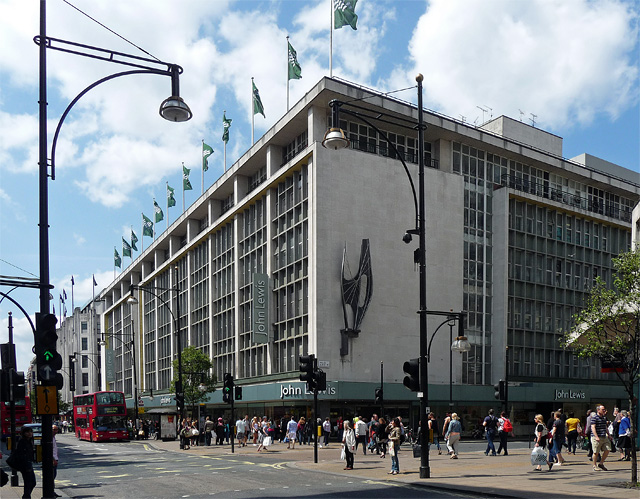
The Oxford Street store of John Lewis

In 1936, Uren became a partner in the practice of Slater, Moberly & Uren; later Slater, Uren and Pike. The practice specialised in the design of department stores including the Oxford Street store of John Lewis (1955) and the extension of Peter Jones in Sloane Square (1966). He also designed the Arthur Sanderson & Sons Building (1958, now the Sanderson Hotel) in Berners Street.

For the London Passenger Transport Board's 1930s extensions of the Piccadilly and Northern lines, Uren worked with Charles Holden on the design of two new station buildings at Rayners Lane (1938) and Finchley Central (unbuilt). Other public buildings designed by Uren include the Granada Cinema at Woolwich (1937, with Cecil Masey and Theodore Komisarjevsky), St George's Swimming Pools in Shadwell (1965) and Norfolk County Hall (1966).

Uren retired from practice in 1967 and returned to New Zealand where he died in 1988.

== Legacy ==
A number of Uren's commissions are recognised as architecturally significant and are listed for protection against uncontrolled alteration. Hornsey Town Hall, the Sanderson Building and the Granada Cinema in Woolwich are listed Grade II* and Rayners Lane station is listed Grade II.
