= Cecil Masey =

English theatre and cinema architect

- Born: 28 December 1880; Lambeth, London
- Died: 7 April 1960 (aged 79); Wallington, Surrey
- Occupation: Architect
- Buildings: New Wimbledon Theatre (1919); Phoenix Theatre (1930); Walthamstow Granada (1930) Granada, Tooting (1931); Granada Cinema, Woolwich (1937); Granada Theatre, Clapham Junction (1937)

Cecil Aubrey Masey (28 December 1880 – 7 April 1960) was an English theatre and cinema architect, born on 28 December 1880 in Lambeth, London. Masey was a pupil of Bertie Crewe—with whom he worked on the Empire music hall in Edmonton of 1908—and from 1909, he went into partnership with architect Roy Young.

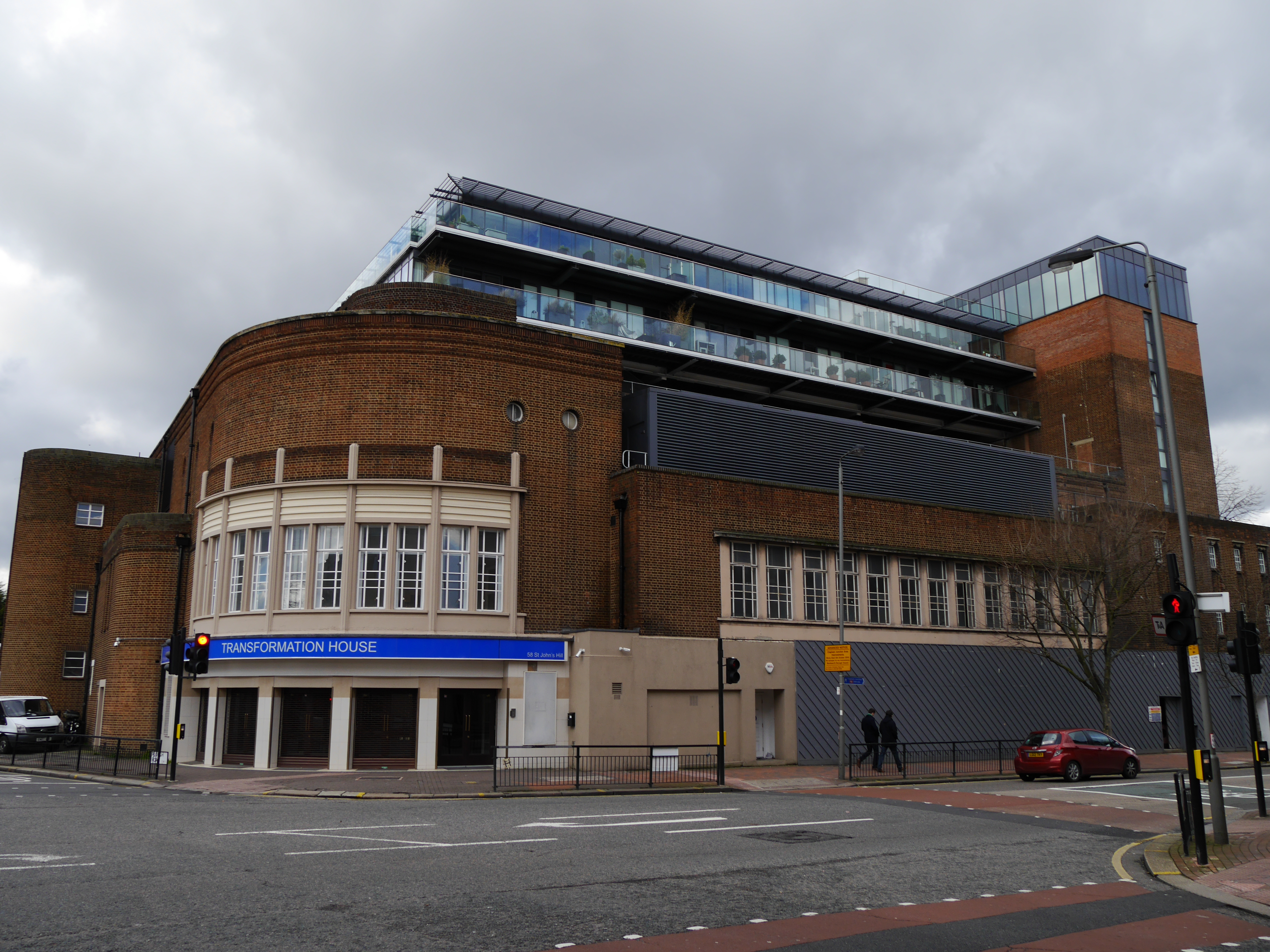
Granada Theatre, Clapham Junction

Some of Masey's earliest designs include the Grade II listed New Wimbledon Theatre, built in 1919 together with Roy Young on the Broadway in Wimbledon, London, and the Electric Theatre in Bournemouth, built in 1919 for Alexander Bernstein. In 1920 Masey also designed the Empire Cinema in Willesden for Bernstein.

The Grade II listed Phoenix Theatre was designed together with Giles Gilbert Scott and Bertie Crewe, and opened in 1930. It is a West End theatre in the London Borough of Camden, located on Charing Cross Road, at the corner with Flitcroft Street, and with the entrance on Phoenix Street.

Other buildings he was involved with include the Grade II* listed Walthamstow Granada, constructed in 1929-30 in Spanish Baroque style, and an important example of the large and elaborate cinemas built by Sidney Bernstein between 1930 and 1939; the Grade I listed Granada Cinema with four Corinthian style pillars over the entrance, located in Tooting, an area in the London Borough of Wandsworth, London, which opened in 1931 - one of the great, luxurious cinemas built in the 1930s; the 1932 Grade II listed cinema in Northfields Avenue, West Ealing, later used as a club and since converted into a church and the now-demolished Rex Cinema, 1936, in Station Approach, Hayes in the London Borough of Hillingdon, West London. He also designed the Grade II* listed Granada Cinema, Woolwich (with Reginald Uren and Theodore Komisarjevsky) and the Granada Theatre, Clapham Junction (with H. R. Horner and Leslie Norton), both built in 1937.

Masey died on 7 April 1960. His address was 29 Woodcote Avenue, Wallington, Surrey.
