= Sanderson Hotel =

Hotel in Westminster, London, England, UK

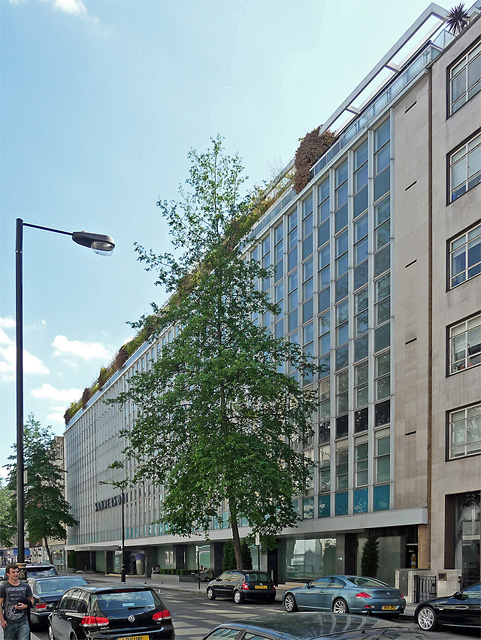

- Location within Central London

General information
- Location: London, England, United Kingdom
- Coordinates: 51°31′3″N 0°8′13.56″W
- Opening: 1958

Design and construction
- Architects: Reginald Uren (Sanderson House); Denton Corker Marshall (Sanderson Hotel)

The Sanderson Hotel is a hotel on Berners Street, London, built in 1958.

== History ==
The hotel occupies the site of 54 Berners Street, known for the Berners Street Hoax of 1810 when it was the home of a Mrs Tottenham.

The hotel was originally built in 1958 as the new headquarters and showroom for Arthur Sanderson and Sons, manufacturers of wallpaper, fabrics and paint, for the company's centennial. The building was designed by architect Reginald Uren, of the architectural firm, Slater and Uren. The original design allowed for dynamic room configurations. The building surrounds a courtyard with a Japanese garden designed by Philip Hicks. The Sanderson building was listed Grade II* by English Heritage in 1991. After refurbishment by Philippe Starck and Denton Corker Marshall, it was reopened by Morgans Hotel Group as the Sanderson Hotel on 25 April 2000.

In 2019 the hotel was sold to Vivion, a real estate firm backed by the Israeli tycoon Amir Dayan.

== Design features ==
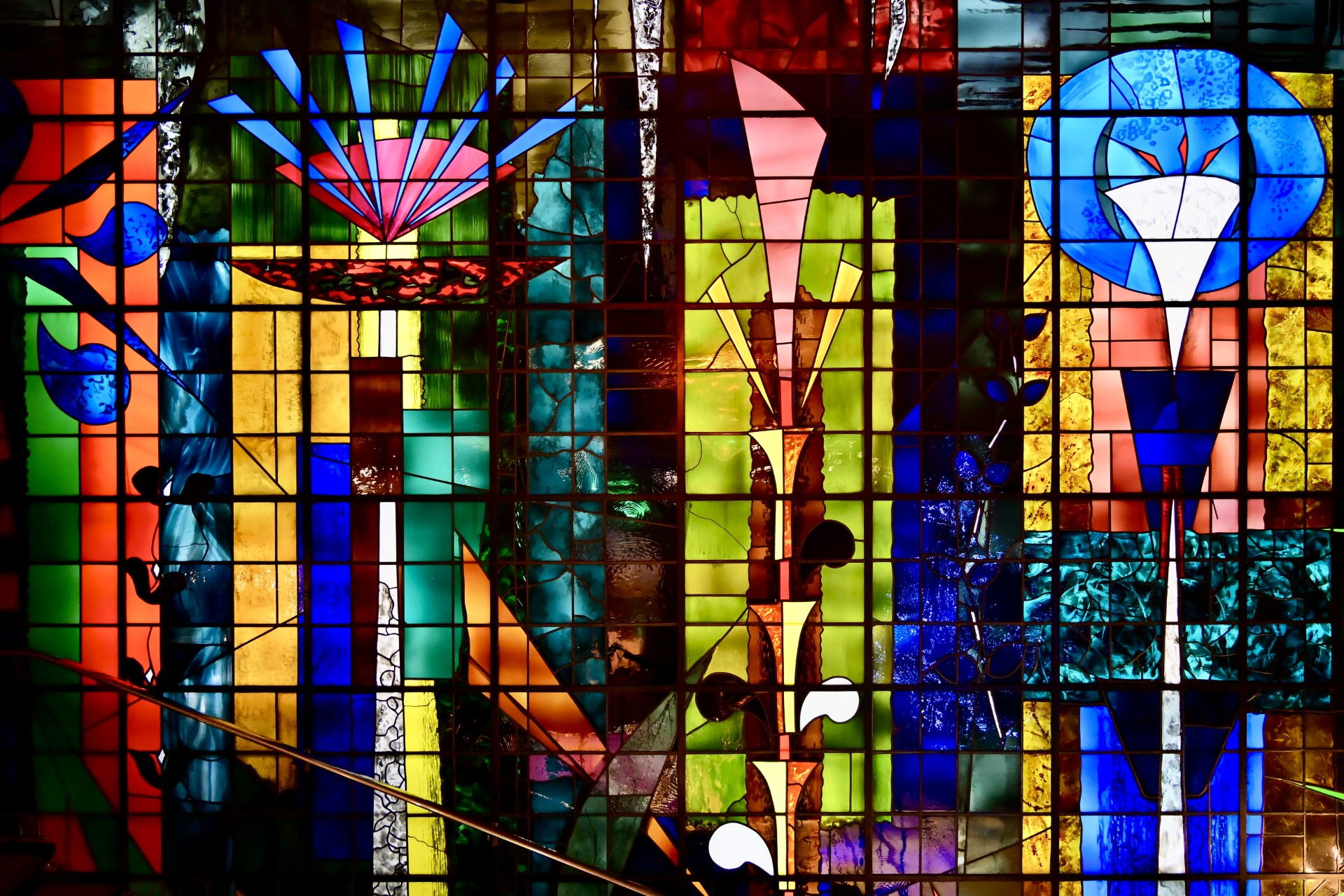
Glass mural by John Piper

The building was constructed with a modernist steel and glass frontage that is seen in the opening footage of the Danger Man television series. The courtyard garden, situated on top of an underground car park, fronted the wholesale trade sales area to the right; the retail areas were to the left and centre. The courtyard garden, designed by landscape architect Philip Hicks, was recreated for the hotel and has been included on the English Heritage register of Parks and Gardens of Historic Interest; originally open to the sky, it was glazed over in the hotel conversion.

The lobby has both lifts and a grand flying staircase which rises against a large backlit stained glass mural masking the lift shafts; this is the largest secular work in glass designed by John Piper, manufactured by his longtime collaborator, Patrick Reyntiens. The first floor was devoted to wallpaper displays and its lengthy retail counter allowed for conversion to a long bar. The second floor was reserved for fabric displays, while the third floor held management offices and an interior design studio.

After refurbishment as a hotel, each room had a sleigh bed with a reproduction of the 1895 painting The Cloud by Prince Eugen bolted to the ceiling above, and a pair of penis-shaped dumbbells. The rooms were redesigned in 2014 by Tim Andreas.

The hotel's Malaysian-European restaurant Suka was designed by India Mahdavi with furnishings by Tom Dixon.

== Popular culture ==
In summer 2009, weekly live music sessions in the Sanderson's courtyard called 'Sanderson Predicts' featured new artists, including both Marina & The Diamonds and Little Boots performing before they were commercially successful.
