= All Saints' Church, Putney Common =

Coordinates: 51°28′01.9″N 0°13′43.6″W

All Saints' Church, Putney
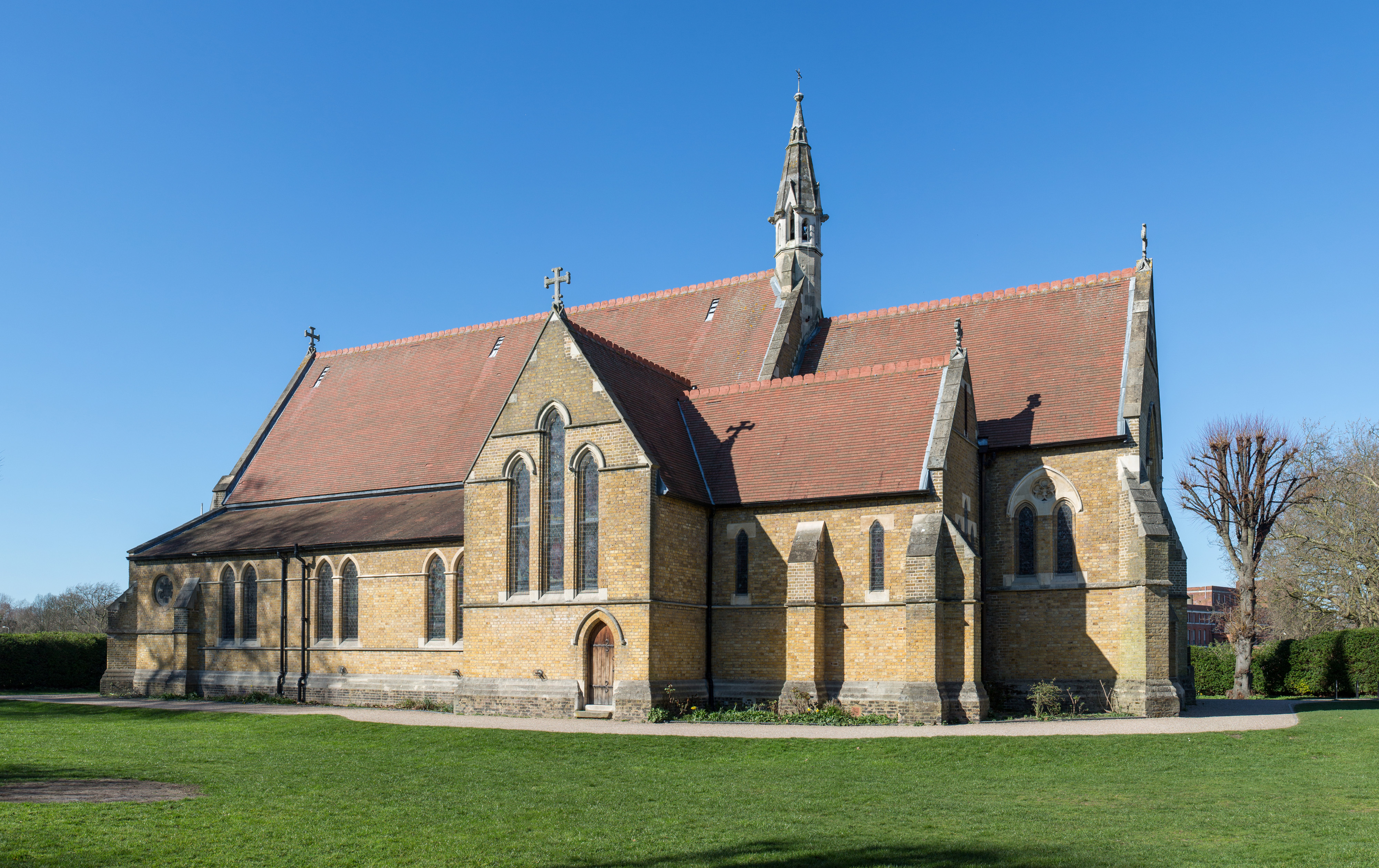
- All Saints' Church, Putney
- Location: Putney, London
- Denomination: Church of England
- Churchmanship: Liberal Catholic
- Website: http://allsaints.parishofputney.com

Administration
- Province: Canterbury
- Diocese: Southwark
- Archdeaconry: Wandsworth
- Deanery: Wandsworth Deanery
- Parish: Putney Team Ministry

Clergy
- Vicar: Team Vicar - The Revd Dr Daniel Trott The Revd John Whittaker (Team Rector)

All Saints Church is a Grade II* listed Anglican church located on Putney Common, London.

All Saints is one of the two churches in the Parish of Putney, the other being St Mary's Church, Putney. The parish is within the Wandsworth Deanery, the Kingston Episcopal Area and the Diocese of Southwark.

== History ==
The church was built 1873–74 on land donated by Earl Spencer, and the foundation stone was laid by HRH Princess Christian of Schleswig-Holstein on 22 April 1873. The church was consecrated by the Bishop of London on 25 April 1874.

The building was designed by George E. Street, working with William Morris and Edward Burne-Jones. The windows are the most extensive glazing scheme by Morris & Co. in any London church. Most of the cartoons (original drawings) for the windows were created for buildings elsewhere (seven were taken from designs drawn in 1874 for a church in Calcutta). All but two windows are the work of Morris & Co., the majority being drawn by Burne-Jones, and six by Morris himself. The windows pre-dating 1896 would have been designed (i.e. colour of glass, painted detail) by William Morris,.

== Recent events ==
It survived an arson attack in January 1993. Police caught the arsonist at two o'clock one morning moments after he ignited oil in the boiler room. Following this there was a £1m renovation programme that led to a new roof and major alterations.
