= Granada Theatre, Clapham Junction =

Former theatre in London

Coordinates: 51.462111°N 0.173313°W

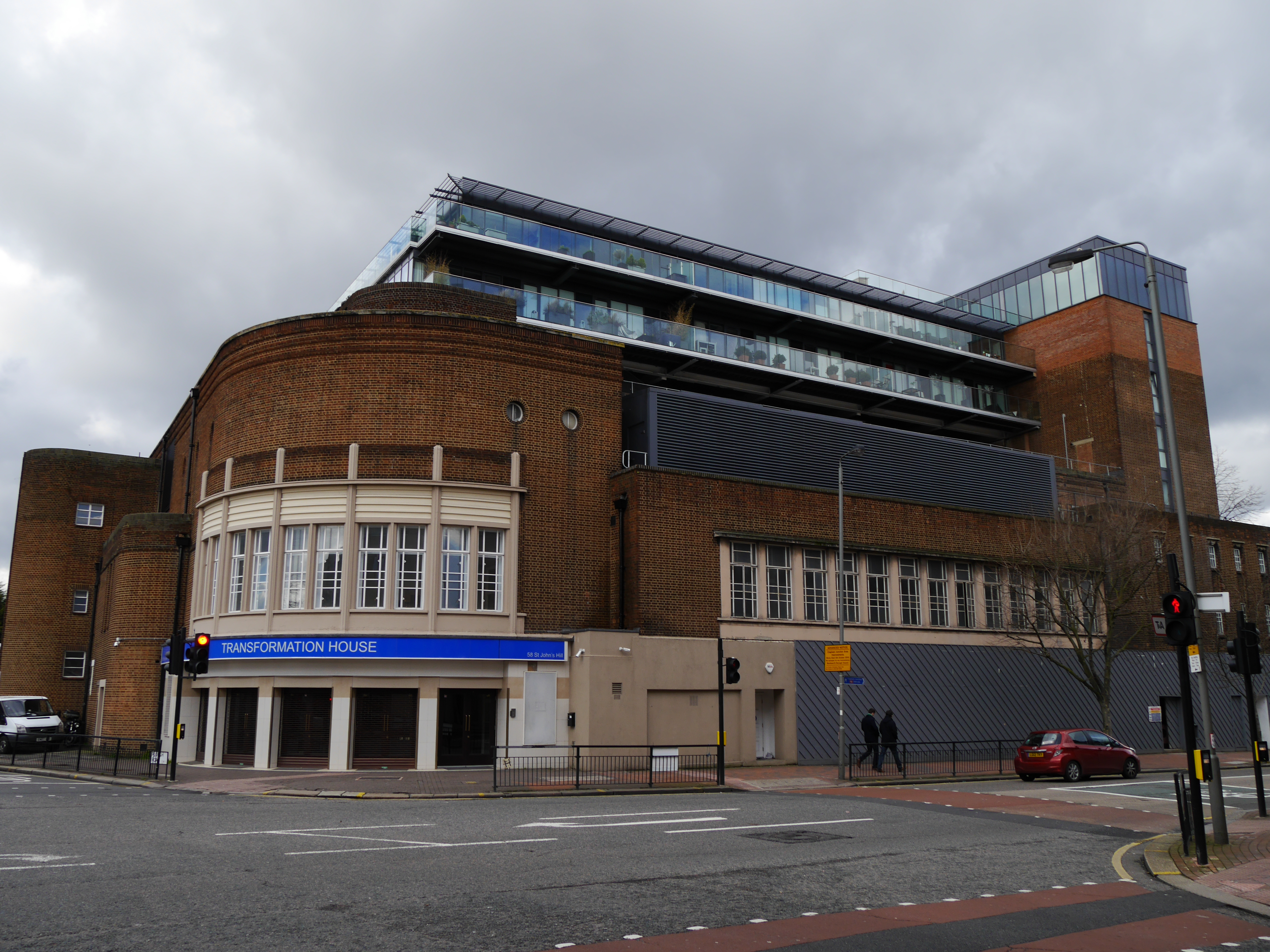
Granada Theatre, Clapham Junction

The Granada Theatre is a Grade II* listed building at St John's Hill, Clapham Junction, London.

It was built in 1937 by the architects Cecil Masey, H R Horner and Leslie Norton, and with interior design by Theodore Komisarjevsky. It closed in 1980, re-opening in May 1991 as a Gala Bingo Hall. This closed in December 1997. It has since been modernised and refurbished and is now a conference venue called Transformation House.
