= Church Row, Wandsworth =

Row of houses in London, England

Coordinates: 51°27′28″N 0°11′41″W

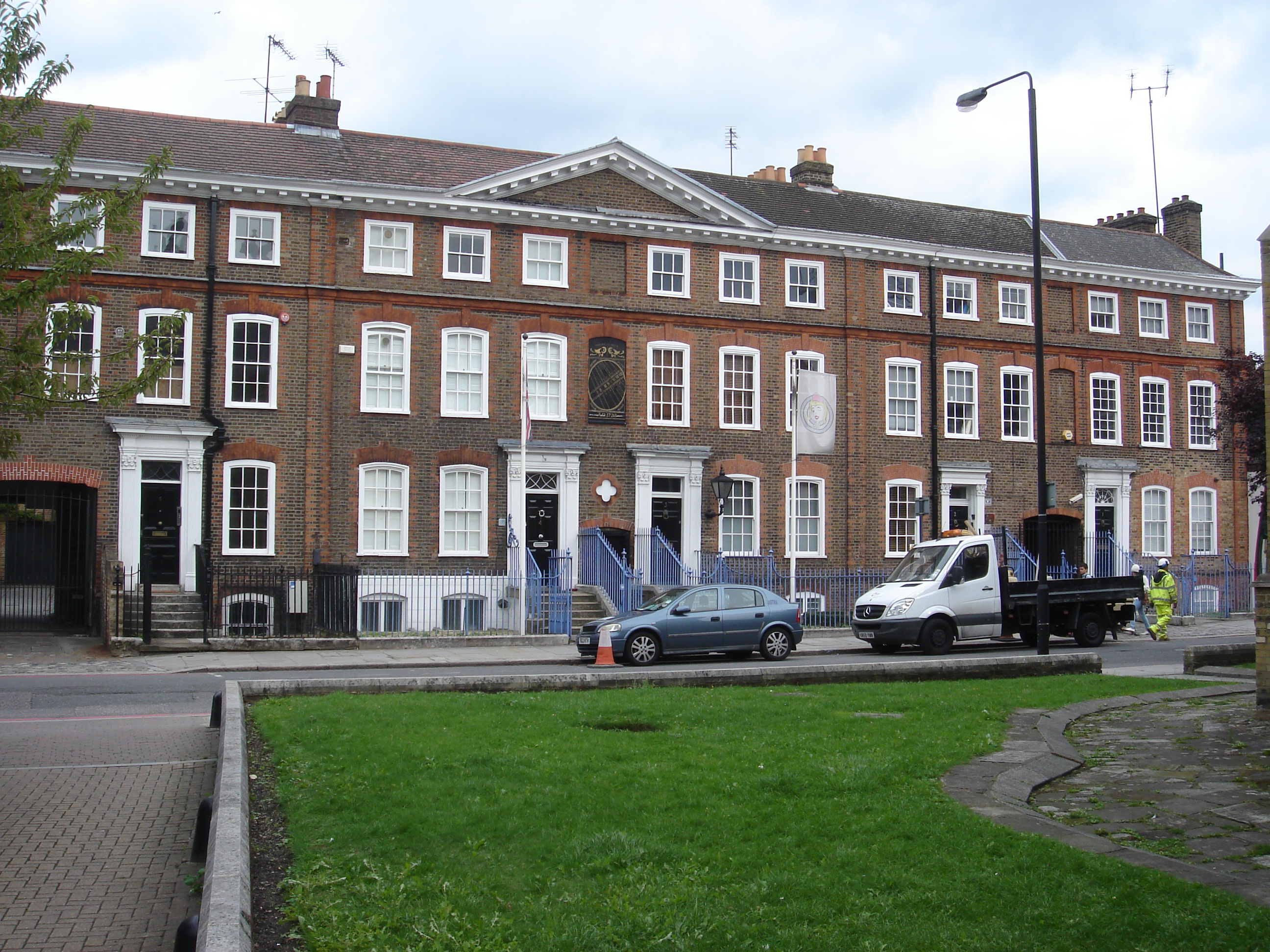
Church Row, Wandsworth

Church Row, Wandsworth is a Grade II* listed row of houses at 1–6, Wandsworth Plain, London SW18.

This terrace of Georgian houses was built in 1723.
