= St Mary's Church, Putney =

Coordinates: 51°27′56.35″N 0°12′49.74″W

St. Mary's Church, Putney
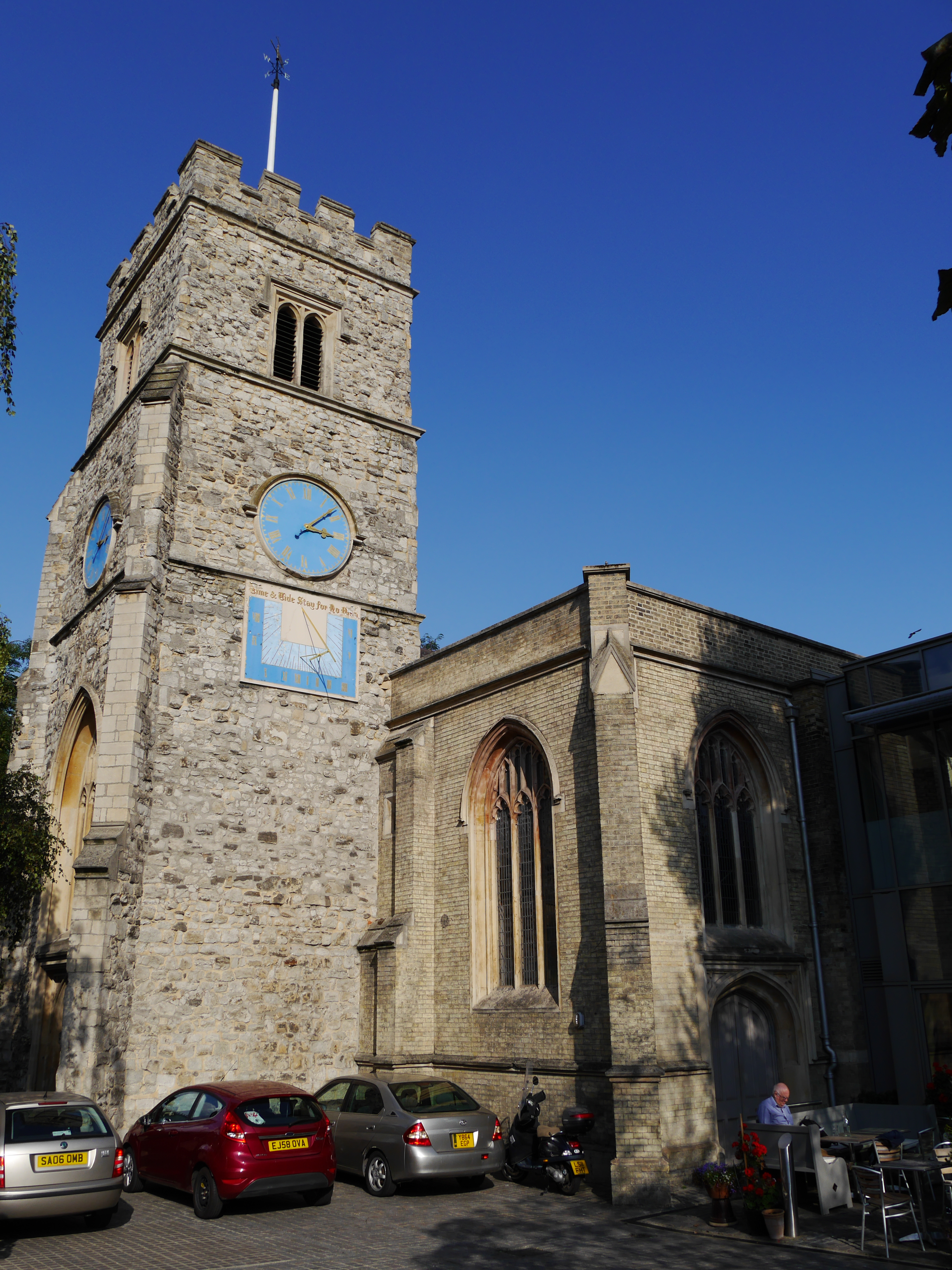
- St. Mary's Church in 2014
- St. Mary's Church, Putney
- Location: Putney High Street, Putney, Greater London, SW15 1SN
- Country: England
- Denomination: Church of England
- Churchmanship: Liberal Anglo-Catholic
- Website: http://www.parishofputney.com/

History
- Dedication: St Mary the Virgin

Architecture
- Heritage designation: Grade II*

Administration
- Province: Canterbury
- Diocese: Southwark (Kingston Episcopal Area)
- Archdeaconry: Wandsworth
- Deanery: Wandsworth
- Parish: Putney

Clergy
- Vicar(s): Revd John Whittaker (Team Rector)

The Church of St. Mary the Virgin, Putney, is an Anglican church in Putney, London, sited next to the River Thames, beside the southern approach to Putney Bridge. There has been a centre of Christian worship on the site from at least the 13th century, and the church is still very active today. It is also noteworthy as the site of the Putney Debates on the English constitution in 1647, during the English Civil War. It has been Grade II* listed since 1955.

Parts of the existing church have survived from medieval times, such as the 15th-century tower and some of the nave arcading, and the early 16th-century Bishop West Chapel, built by Bishop Nicholas West. Most of the building dates from the substantial reconstruction of 1836 to the designs of Edward Lapidge, which largely rebuilt the body of the church in yellow brick with stone dressings and perpendicular windows. Some of the medieval pillars and arches in the nave were retained, and the north and the south arcades were widened.

In 1973 much of the church was gutted by fire. Rebuilding was not completed until nearly ten years later, when the church was rehallowed by Rt. Revd. Michael Marshall the Bishop of Woolwich, on 6 February 1982. Since the restoration, the altar has not been positioned, as is usual, in the chancel or even at the eastern end of the nave, but instead halfway down the northern side of the nave, with the seating arranged to reflect this. The architect of the restoration was Ronald Sims. The pipe organ is by the Danish firm of Marcussen & Søn.

Inscribed on a wall of the church is a quote from the Putney debates (1647) by Colonel Thomas Rainsborough:

For really I think that the poorest he that is in England hath a life to live, as the greatest he.

In 2005 a new extension to the church, the "Brewer Building", built at a cost of £1.7m was opened by the Bishop of Southwark.

St. Mary's is one of the two churches in the Parish of Putney, the other being All Saints' Church, Putney Common. The parish is within the Wandsworth Deanery, the Kingston Episcopal Area and the Diocese of Southwark.

== Notable people associated with St Mary's ==
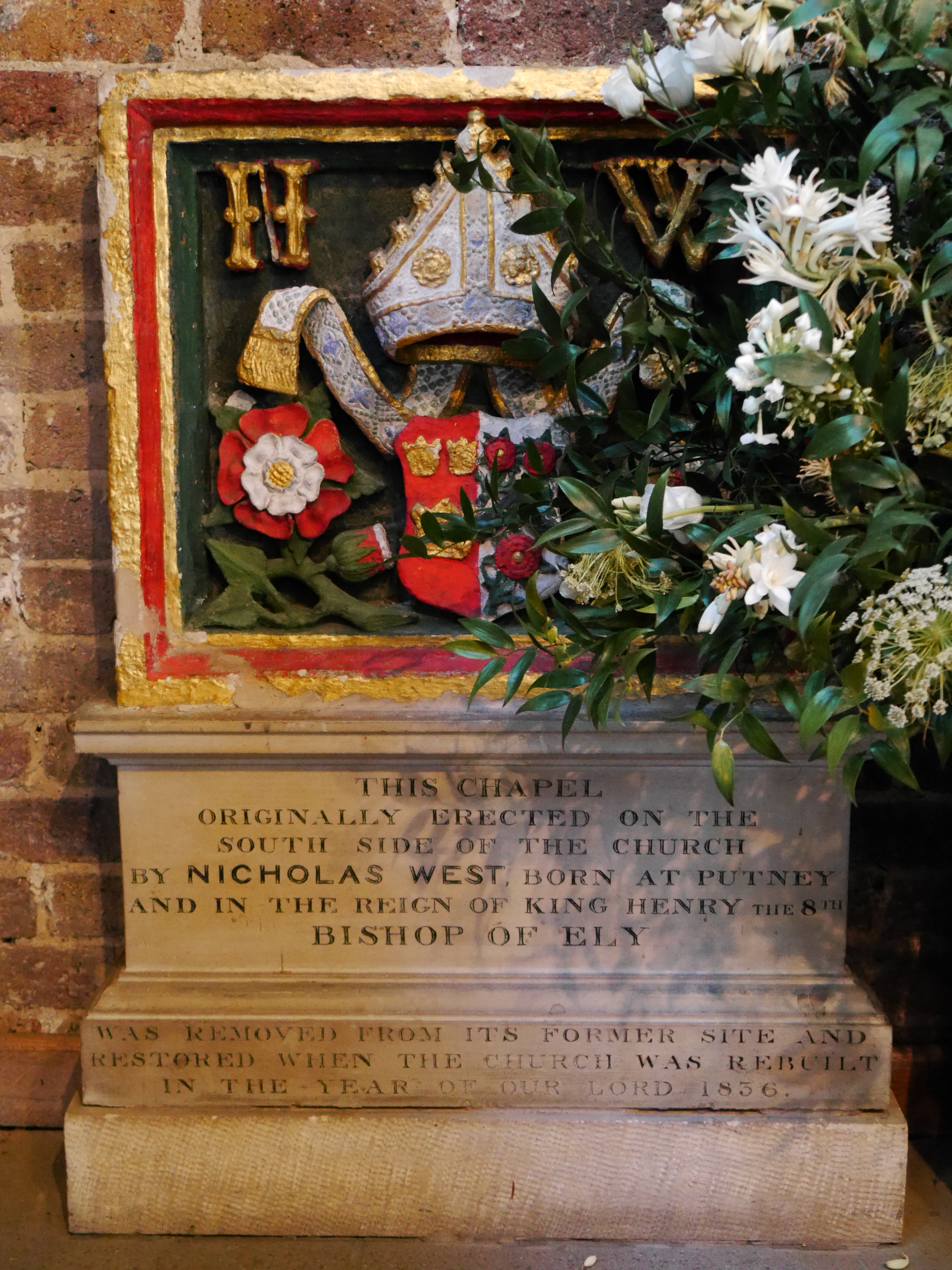
Nicholas West memorial

- Nicholas West (1461 – 28 April 1533), bishop and diplomat, was born at Putney, and educated at Eton and at King's College, Cambridge, of which he became a fellow in 1486. He built two chapels, one in St. Mary's and the other in Ely Cathedral, where he is buried.
- Thomas Cromwell, born in Putney, was Chancellor of the Exchequer between 1533 and 1540
- Samuel Pepys mentions St. Mary's in his diary for 1667. He attended a service where he heard 'a good sermon'. He saw the girls of the school, 'few of which were pretty'.
- Charles Dickens made St. Mary's the setting for David Copperfield's marriage to Dora Spenlow
- Giles Fraser, Anglican priest and broadcaster, was a former Team Rector of St Mary's 2000-2009, where he campaigned to raise the profile of the Putney Debates
