= Old Battersea House =

Building in Battersea, London, England

Coordinates: 51°28′26″N 0°10′35″W

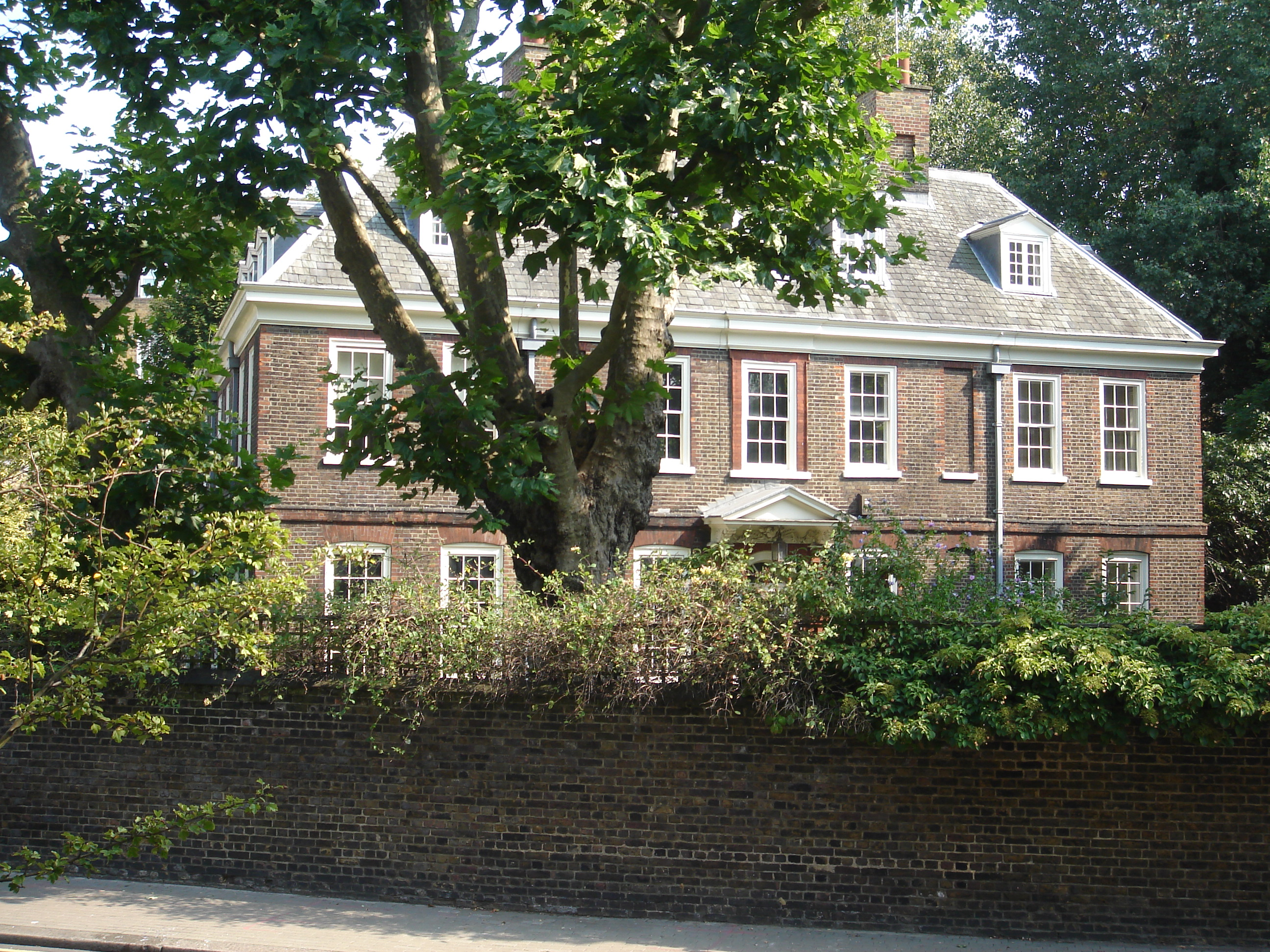
Old Battersea House viewed from Vicarage Crescent

Old Battersea House is one of the oldest surviving buildings in Battersea, South West London and is Grade II* listed. It was built around 1699, and was once rumoured to have been designed by Sir Christopher Wren.

== Building ==
Until the 1930s, the building was known as Terrace House. It was built for the "naval administrator" Samuel Pett, and was most likely completed in 1699.

John Perry (shipbuilder) had bought the house in 1810 and "Changes to Perry’s will make clear that the Terrace House was intended as his permanent residence, but he died soon after his purchase in 1810, leaving it to his second wife Mary."

Between 1840 and 1926, the house was occupied by a teacher training college - Battersea College, later St Johns College. Founded by James Kay-Shuttleworth, it was the first institution dedicated to training teachers specifically for disadvantaged children. St Johns merged with St Marks College Chelsea on the Chelsea site between 1923 and 1926, forming the College of St Mark and St John. It moved to Plymouth in 1973. Battersea Council almost demolished the house in the 1920s and built St. John's estate (now Battersea Village) on the grounds of the house in the 1930s. In 1931 it passed into the possession of novelist Wilhelmina Stirling, who renamed it Old Battersea House. Under her tenure the house served to house a collection of art by her sister, the Pre-Raphaelite painter Evelyn De Morgan, and Evelyn's husband, the potter designer William De Morgan. This collection is now kept by the De Morgan Foundation.

The building was listed on 28 June 1954 and became derelict after Stirling's death in 1965. It was acquired by Malcolm Forbes in 1970 and housed some of his family's valuable art collection until 2011.
