= Liberal Anglo-Catholicism =

Theologically and socially liberal

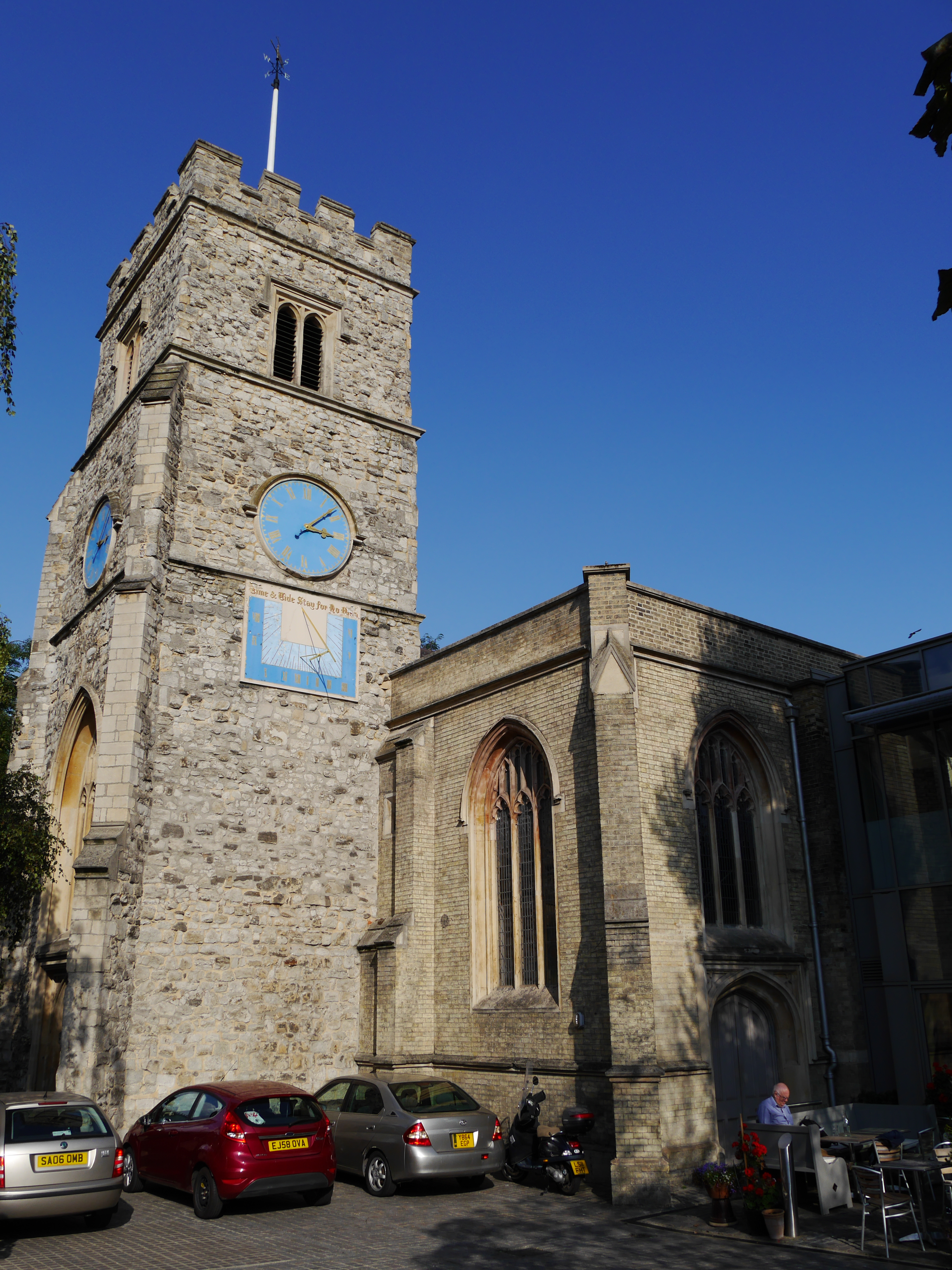
St Mary's, Putney, a church within the tradition of liberal Anglo-Catholicism, where the meeting that led to the creation of Inclusive Church was held in 2003.

The terms liberal Anglo-Catholicism, liberal Anglo-Catholic or simply liberal Catholic, refer to people, beliefs, and practices within Anglicanism that affirm liberal Christian perspectives while maintaining various traditions associated with Anglo-Catholicism.

== Description and history ==
Science and religion are held to be legitimate and different methodologies of revealing God's truth. This also directly affects the liberal Anglo-Catholic's reading of scripture, ecclesiastical history, and general methodology of theology. A metaphor is that theology for liberal Anglo-Catholics is a "dance" that allows people to slowly grow in an understanding of God.

In the UK the Affirming Catholicism movement is home to many liberal Anglo-Catholics. Examples of liberal Anglo-Catholics include the former Archbishops of Canterbury Rowan Williams and Michael Ramsey. Westcott House is a Church of England theological college in the tradition of liberal Anglo-Catholicism.

== See also ==
- Inclusive theology
- Liberal theology
- Society of Catholic Priests
