= Devonshire House, Battersea =

Historic house in London, England

Coordinates: 51°28′28″N 0°10′33″W

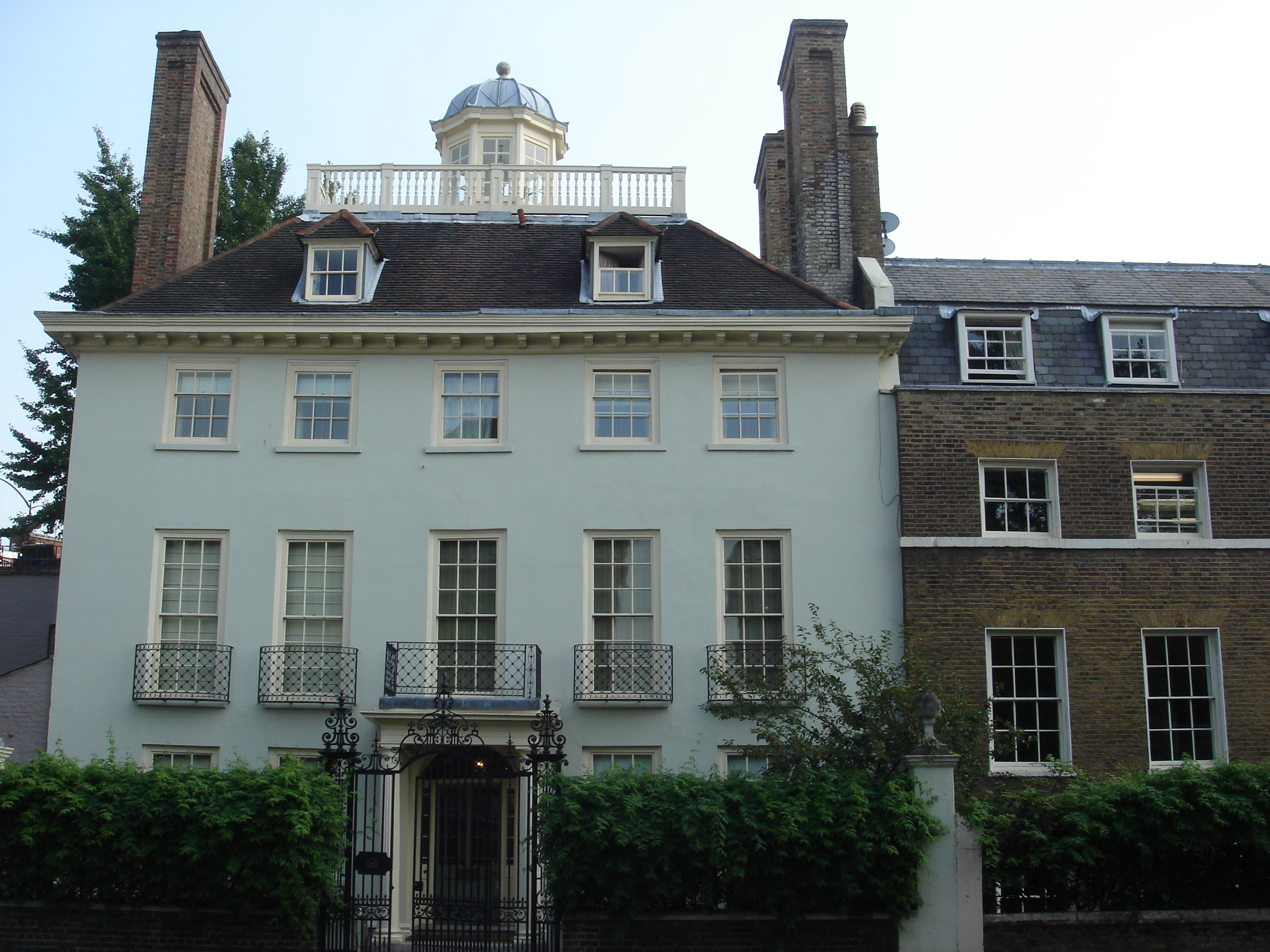
Devonshire House in 2013

Devonshire House is an 18th-century house at 44 Vicarage Crescent, Battersea, London. It is a listed Grade II* on the National Heritage List for England along with its iron gate and railings. The interior of the house contains its original paneling.
