= Vidim Books =

Publishing house based in Slovakia

- Formation: 2023
- Founder: Alexander Gavrilov, Maria Alef, Danila Stratovich
- Type: Independent publishing house
- Headquarters: Bratislava, Slovakia
- Official language: Russian
- Website: vidimbooks.com

Vidim Books is a publishing house focused on literature struggling with censorship in Russia. It is considered a part of the new Tamizdat movement.

== History ==
Vidim Books was founded in 2023 by three co-founders, Maria Alef, Danila Stratovich, and Alexander Gavrilov. The name is an acronym for the Russian phrase во имя добра и мира, "in the name of goodness and peace". The announced authors included Dmitry Glukhovsky, Vera Polozkova, Andrei Zubov, and Andrey Kuraev. The publishing house's staff included émigrés, anonymous contributors from Russia, and contributors from Ukraine. According to the publishers, a portion of the profits goes to aid those affected by the Russo-Ukrainian war.

Vidim Books was registered in Slovakia and operates as both a publisher and a distribution platform for Russian-language books across Europe, Central Asia, and North America. To protect staff members from potential prosecution under Russian law, the names of several team members were replaced with black rectangles in the colophons of early publications.

In 2024, Vidim Books became the first publisher to place Russian-language books on the physical shelves of Luxor, a Czech bookstore chain, following the removal of Russian-language sections from most European bookstores after 2022.

In September 2025, Vidim Books organized Vidim Fest, a two-day cultural festival held in Amsterdam, with over 4,000 attendees. Participants included Chulpan Khamatova, Anton Dolin, Vera Polozkova, Sasha Filipenko, and Dmitry Krymov, among others.

In October 2026, Vidim Books was designated as an undesirable organization in Russia.
