= Theodore Komisarjevsky =

Russian and British theatrical director (1882–1954)

- Фёдор Комиссаржевский
- Komisarjevsky in c. 1930
- Born: Fyodor Fyodorovich Komissarzhevsky; 23 May 1882; Venice, Italy
- Died: 17 April 1954 (aged 71); Darien, Connecticut, U.S.
- Education: Saint Petersburg University; Imperial Institute of Architecture
- Occupations: Theatrical director; designer
- Known for: Productions of plays by Chekhov and Shakespeare
- Spouses: Elfriede de Jarosy (divorced) Peggy Ashcroft (m. 1934; div. 1936): Ernestine Stodelle
- Children: 3
- Parents: Fyodor Komissarzhevsky (father); Lithuanian Princess Marie Kursevich (mother)
- Relatives: Vera Komissarzhevskaya (elder sister)

Fyodor Fyodorovich Komissarzhevsky (Russian: Фёдор Фёдорович Комиссаржевский; 23 May 1882 – 17 April 1954), commonly known as Theodore Komisarjevsky, was a Russian and British theatrical director and designer. He began his career in Moscow, but had his greatest influence in London. He was noted for groundbreaking productions of plays by Chekhov and Shakespeare.

== Early life ==
Komisarjevsky was born in Venice, the son of Fyodor Komissarzhevsky and his second wife, Lithuanian Princess Marie Kursevich. Fyodor was the principal tenor of the Imperial Opera in Saint Petersburg and the teacher of the influential theatre director Konstantin Stanislavsky. The actress Vera Komissarzhevskaya was Theodore's elder half-sister. He was educated at Saint Petersburg University and the Imperial Institute of Architecture.

== Career ==
In 1907, Komisarjevsky directed his first production, for his half-sister's theatre in Moscow. (She died in 1910, aged 45.) In the same year, he founded a drama school in Moscow, adding a studio-theatre in her memory in 1914. During the rest of the Imperial era, and later under the Soviet régime, Komisarjevsky worked as a producer and director in Moscow until 1919, when, fearing arrest by the secret police, he escaped to Paris. On the advice of his fellow émigré Serge Diaghilev he went from there to London. Sir Thomas Beecham appointed him to direct the opera Prince Igor at Covent Garden, described by The Times as "outstanding … [a] magnificent production". Further operatic work followed in Paris and New York. Greatly disapproving of the short rehearsal time allotted to some of his operatic work, he became known for his insistence on adequate preparation.

=== London and Chekhov ===
In 1919, Komisarjevsky formed LAHDA, the Russian Musical Dramatic Art Society, in London with tenor Vladimir Rosing and dancer Laurent Novikoff. The purpose of the organization was to “bring closer friendship and understanding” between England and Russia “by means of art and its beauty of expression.”

In June 1921, Rosing and Komisarkevsky presented a season of "Opera Intime" at the Aeolian Hall in London, with members of the British Symphony Orchestra conducted by Adrian Boult. The operas given were The Queen of Spades, The Barber of Seville, Bastien und Bastienne and Pagliacci. The Times commented that the staging gave an "irritating sense of amateurishness," however The Observer judged that Komisarjevsky had been "very ingenious" in adapting the operas for the small stage.

In 1921, Komsarjevsky earned good notices for his production of Chekhov's Uncle Vanya for the Stage Society, in Constance Garnett's translation. He was praised for capturing the authentic Russian atmosphere of the play as English directors had failed to do. For the next five years, he produced and sometimes designed productions in London with success, and he became more widely known in 1925 and 1926 when he collaborated with Philip Ridgeway, the proprietor of the small Barnes Theatre in a western suburb of London, in a succession of Russian plays. He assembled a company including John Gielgud, Charles Laughton, Jean Forbes-Robertson, Jeanne de Casalis and Martita Hunt. His productions of Chekhov in particular changed how British actors, audiences and critics understood the dramatist's works. The critic J T Grein wrote in 1926:

He has, in some cases with great success, remoulded the English man or woman into a Russian. He has relaxed the phlegm; he has taught them to say momentous things in the most off-hand manner; he has imbued them with the spirit of concealing art by being wholly natural. ... He seeks evenness with but an occasional rise of temperature – now brought about by vodka, now by the long-pent-up feelings of the disillusioned idealist. The result is ... interesting, fascinating, puzzling, despite its sameness of movement.

In 1932, Komisarjevsky became a British national. In the same year, he worked for the first time at the Shakespeare Memorial Theatre in Stratford-upon-Avon. Critics thought his production of The Merchant of Venice spectacular but distracting from Shakespeare's text. The Oxford Dictionary of National Biography (ODNB) refers to his Shakespeare productions as "unorthodox and provocative, sometimes brilliant, sometimes merely wayward", and comments that he showed little respect for the texts or for Shakespeare's poetry. Nonetheless the ODNB judges them valuable for showing up conventional productions as routine and humdrum.

Komisarjevsky, though bald, short and "no Adonis", as one of his many conquests described him, was a persistent and successful womaniser. Edith Evans, one who did not succumb to his charms, dubbed him "Come-and-seduce-me". His first marriage, to Elfriede de Jarosy, ended in divorce. His second wife was the actress Peggy Ashcroft. The marriage was short-lived (1934–1936) but they continued to work together afterwards, and she learned much from him about the craft of acting. In the view of The Manchester Guardian his 1936 production of The Seagull, with Ashcroft as Nina, Evans as Arkadina and Gielgud as Trigorin was the director's outstanding achievement. His last production in Britain was The Comedy of Errors at Stratford in 1939.

== Later life and death ==
When World War II broke out, Komisarjevsky was in the United States, which remained his home for the rest of his life. He devoted his time more to lecturing and teaching than to production. One theatrical venture was in Canada, where he directed Cymbeline in 1950 for the Montreal Festival of Music and Drama. In the last year of his life, the Arts Theatre in London invited him to direct there, but his health did not permit it.

In 1946, Komisarjevsky made his debut with the New York City Opera, staging Tchaikovsky's Eugene Onegin. With that company, he went on to direct Andrea Chénier, Don Giovanni, Aïda (with Camilla Williams, Suzy Morris, Ramón Vinay, and Lawrence Winters, with George Balanchine as choreographer), L'amour des trois oranges (in a production "devised by" Komisarjevsky; he became ill before the opening), and, in 1952, Wozzeck (with Marko Rothmüller and Patricia Neway).

Komisarjevsky died at his home in Darien, Connecticut, on 17 April 1954, survived by his third wife, the dancer Ernestine Stodelle (1905–2008). It is not known how many children he left from his various affairs, but the ODNB records two sons and one daughter.

== Legacy ==
Komisarjevsky wrote several books. Those published in English include Myself and the Theatre (1930), The Costume of the Theatre (1931) and The Theatre and a changing Civilization (1935). His books in Russian include Theatrical Preludes; The Costume, and The Art of the Actor.

Komisarjevsky left a lasting legacy in London in the shape of theatre and cinema interiors he designed, including the Phoenix Theatre in Charing Cross Road, the Tooting Granada, the first cinema to be awarded Grade I-listed building status, the Woolwich Granada, Granada Walthamstow (1930) and five other auditoria originally built for the same cinema chain.

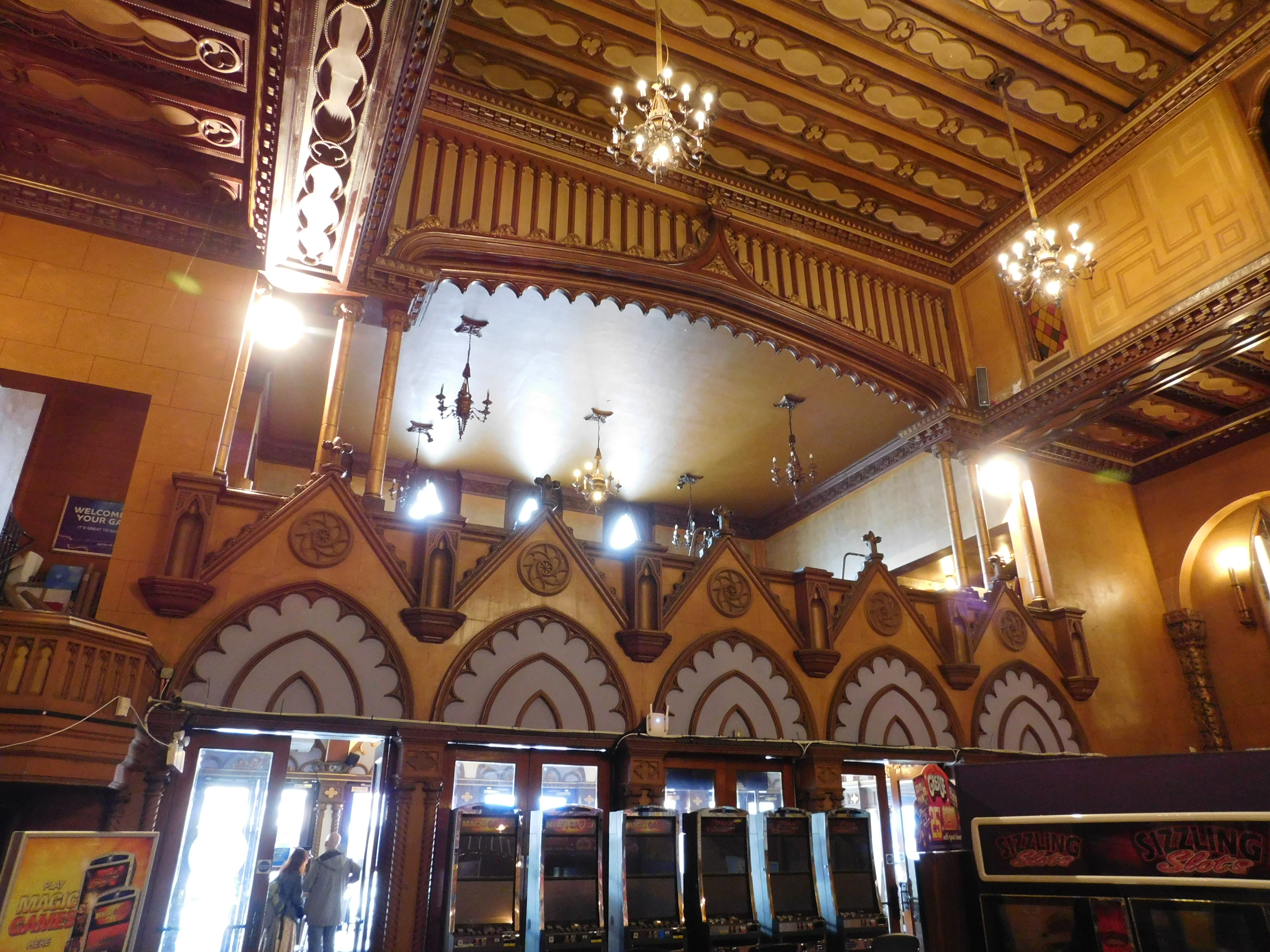
Tooting Granada

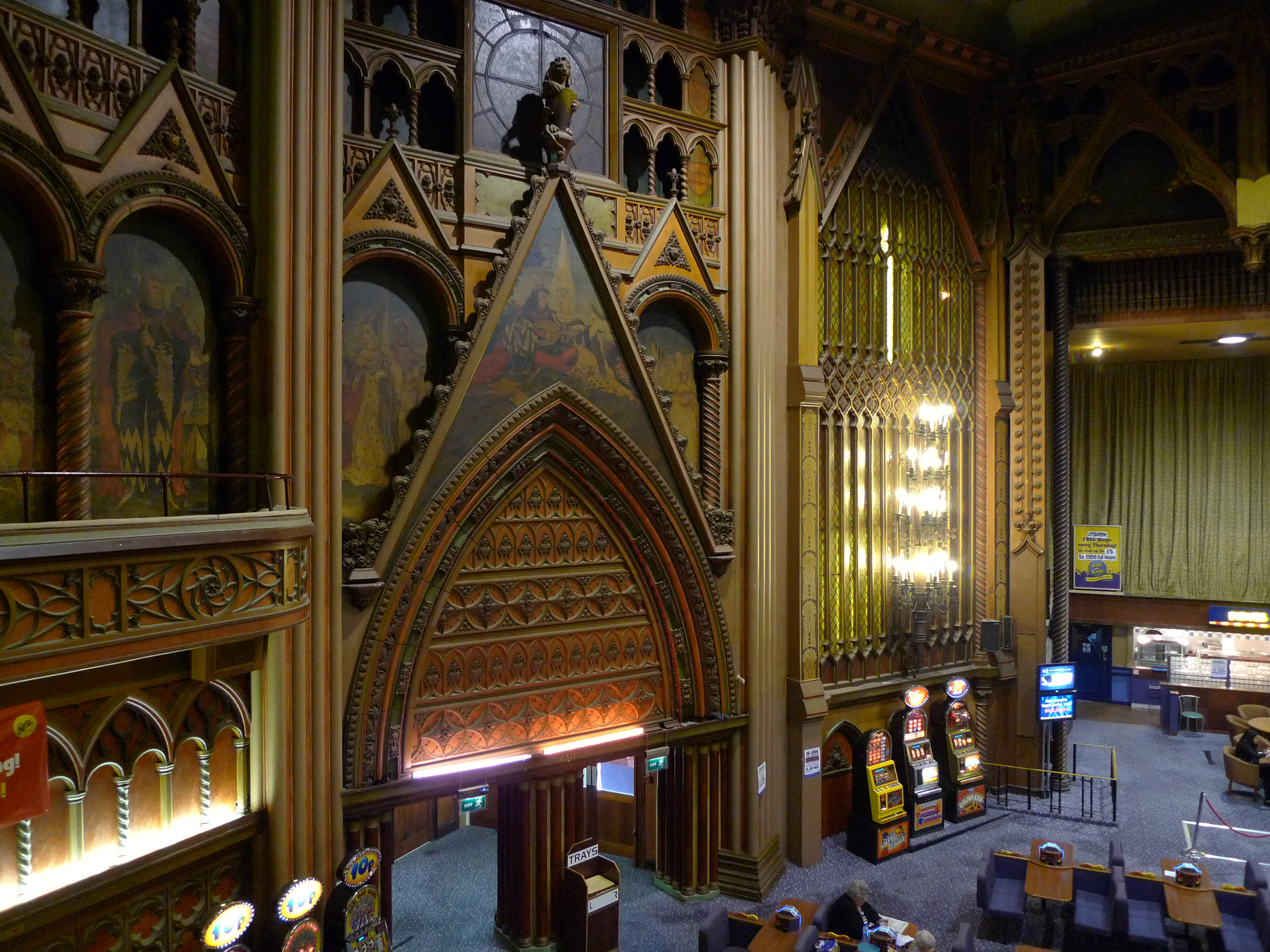
Tooting Granada

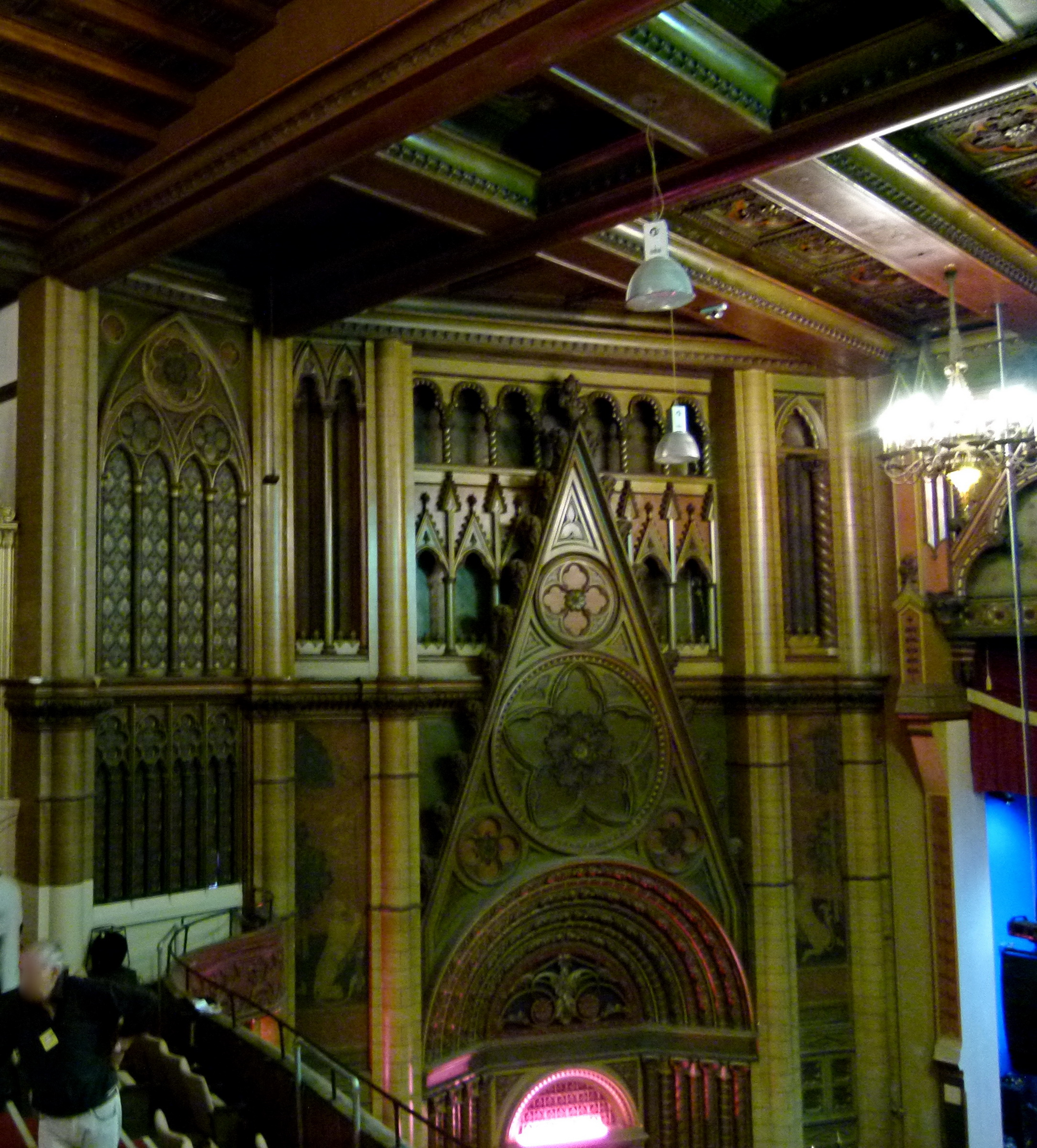
Woolwich Granada

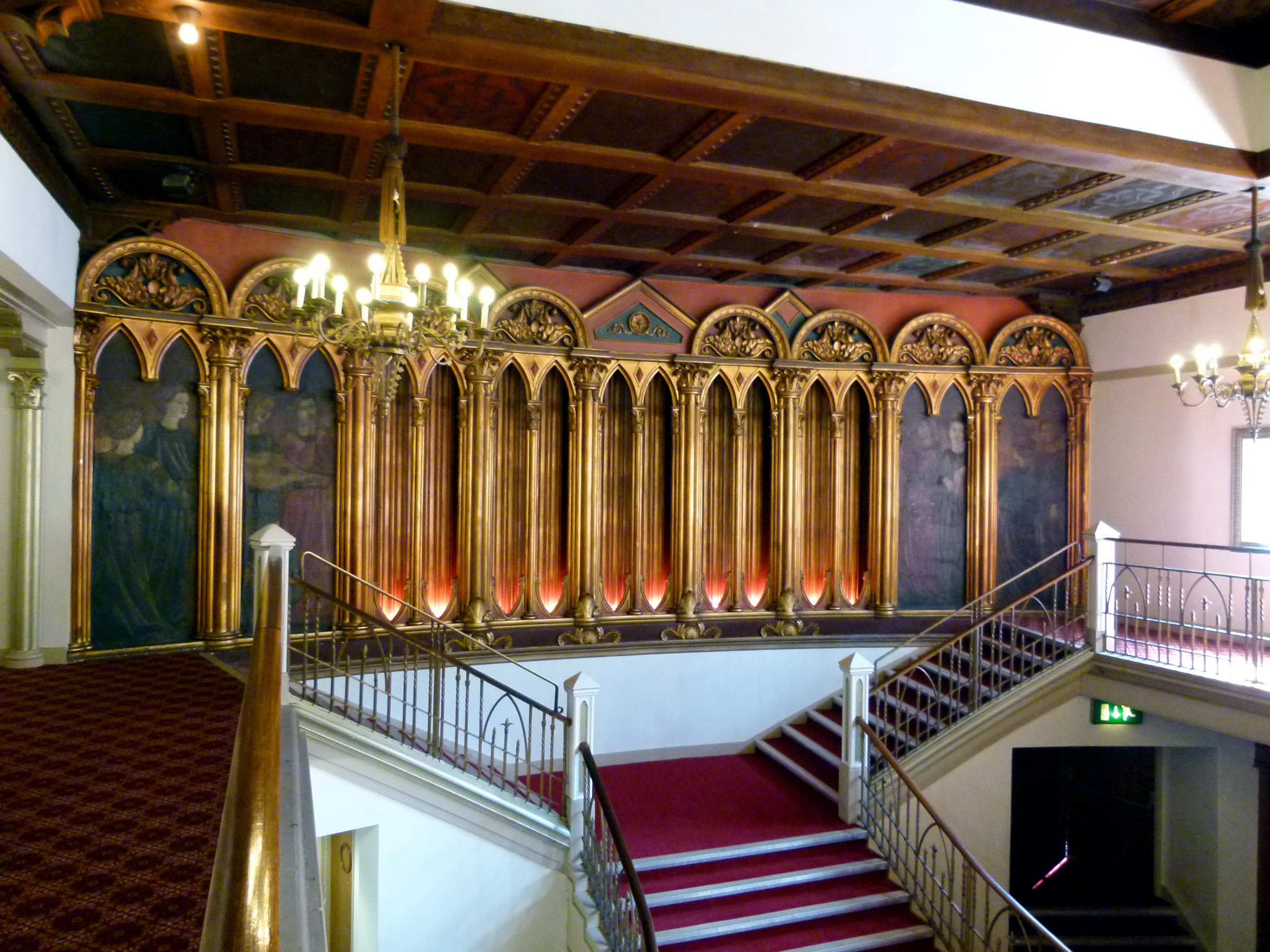
Woolwich, staircase

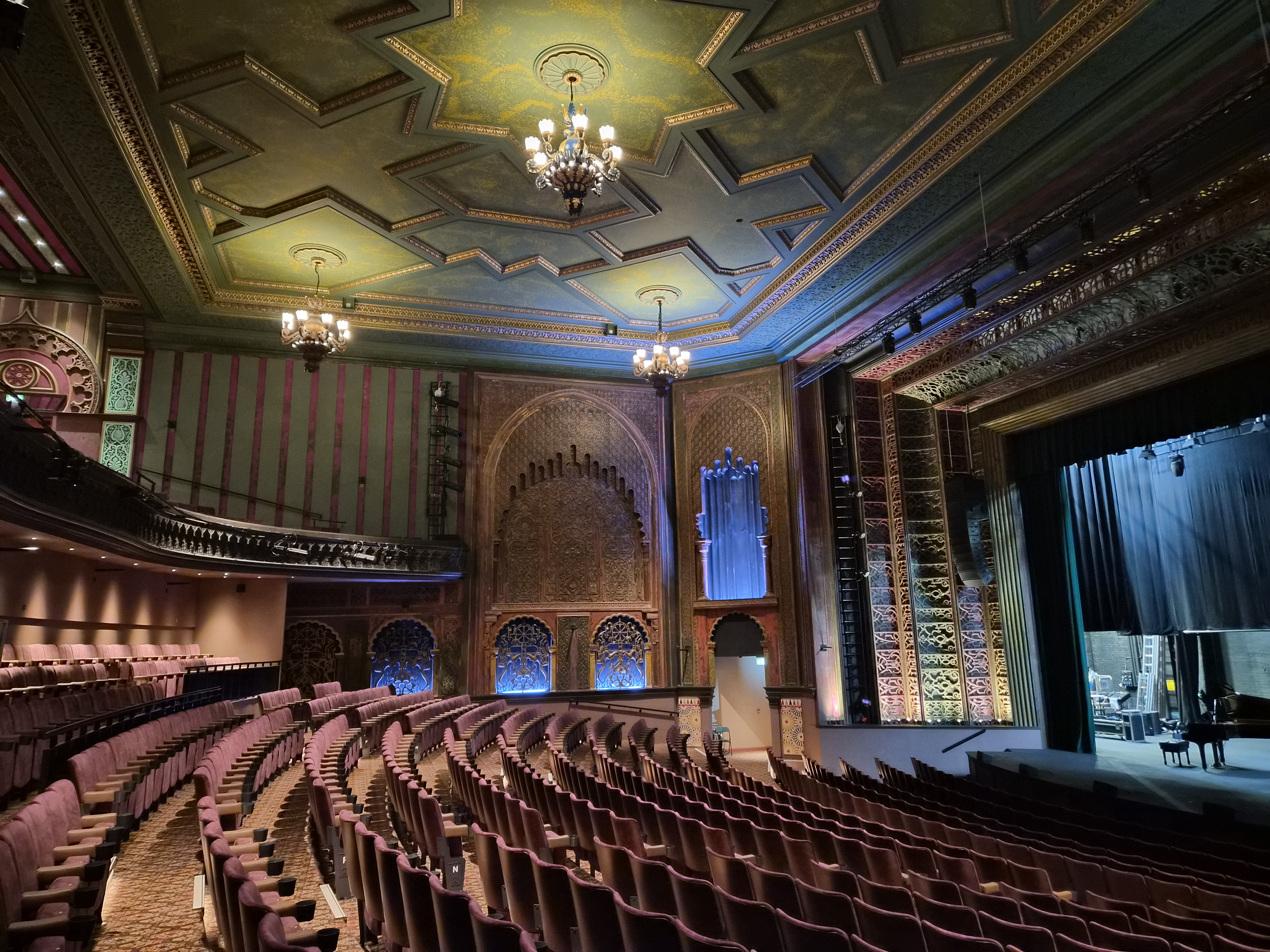
Soho Theatre Walthamstow
