= Vera Polozkova =

Russian poet, actress and singer (born 1986)

- Вера Полозкова
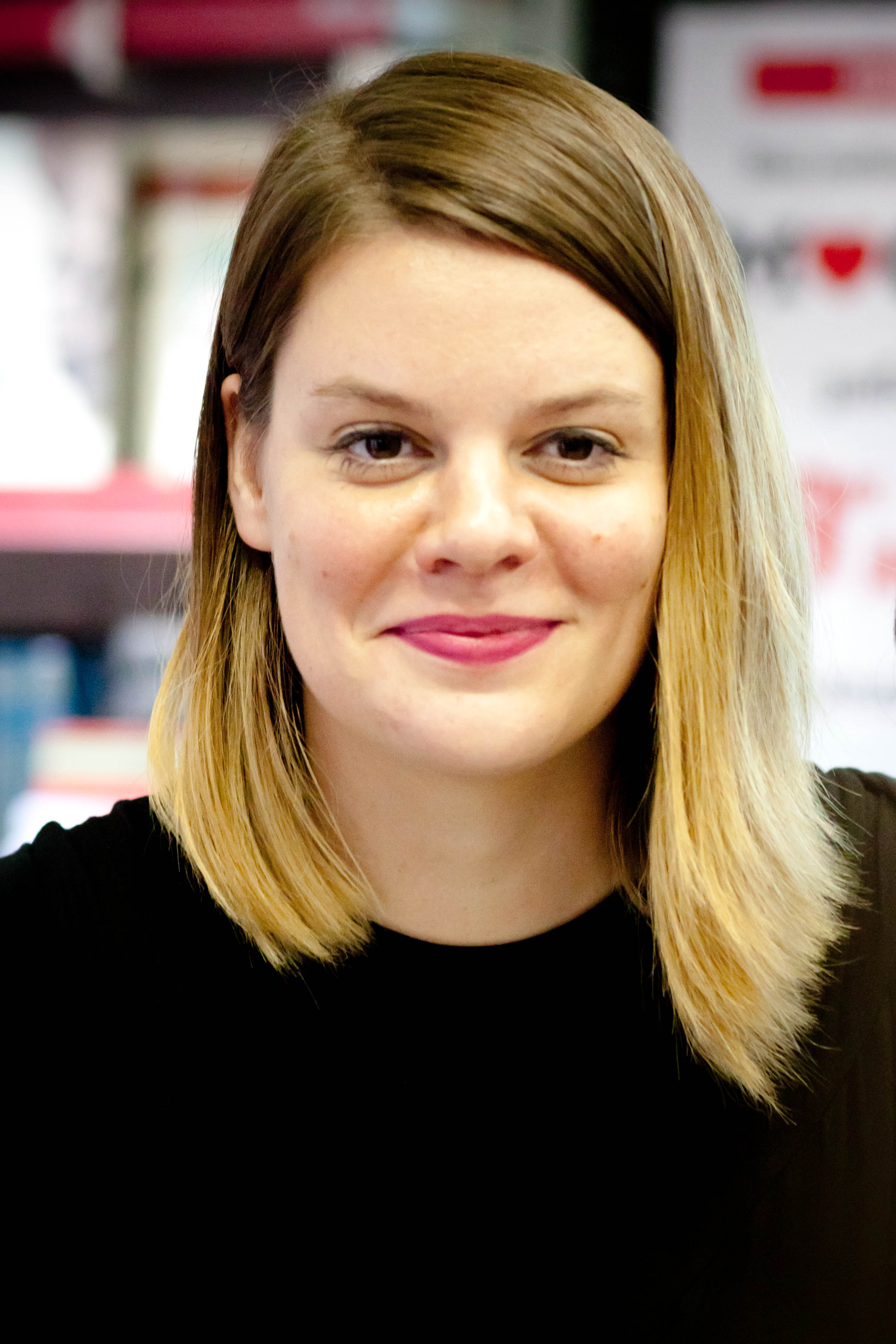
- Polozkova in 2017
- Born: Vera Nikolayevna Polozkova; 5 March 1986 (age 40); Moscow, Russian SFSR, Soviet Union
- Education: Journalism Faculty, Moscow State University
- Occupations: Poet, actress, singer
- Spouse: Alexander Bgantsev (m. 2014; div. 2019)
- Children: 3
- Relatives: Fyodor Komissarzhevsky (great-grandfather); Vera Komissarzhevskaya (great-aunt)

Vera Nikolayevna Polozkova (Russian: Вера Николаевна Полозкова; born 5 March 1986) is a Russian poet, actress, and singer.

== Early life ==
Polozkova was born in Moscow, Russian SFSR, Soviet Union. Her great-grandfather was opera singer Fyodor Komissarzhevsky, and her grandfather's sister was actress Vera Komissarzhevskaya.

== Career ==
Polozkova wrote for the newspaper A Book Review, and the magazines Cosmopolitan and Afisha. Until 2008, she worked in ART4.RU Contemporary Art Museum.

Her first public performance took place in 2007 in the Bulgakov House. Her first book of poems, Nepoemanie, was published in 2008 by the writer Alexander Zhitinsky, whom she met through her blog.

In 2008, she played in an interactive play Georgy Genot Anonymous Artists (Joseph Beuys Theater, together with Theatre.doc). Her first partner in the play was Mikhail Kaluzhsky, followed by Arman Bekenov (co-author). In 2008, Livebook published her collection, Photosynthesis. It was released in conjunction with photographer Olga Pavolga. The collection includes Pavolga's text and photos. Subsequently, Photosynthesis was reissued three times in connection with the commercial success of the book.

In February 2009, she was awarded Curiosities in the category of Poetry.

On 8 June, 2011, Polozkova debuted her demo album Sign of Inequality, and during the first week, sales on the internet ranked first in the number of downloads on the site muz.ru. The record did not come out on physical media, because from the beginning it was declared as a pen test. Lena Grachyova produced and was the author of the musical concept. Sergei Goychayev wrote the music. Subsequently, Grachyova founded a musical group and music authorship was shared. Group members (at different times): Sergey Goychayev – keyboards, Nikolai Saginashvili – acoustic guitar, Alexander Bgantsev – bass guitar, Anatoly Levitin – drums, Vladimir Litsov – electric guitar.

From autumn 2011 to summer 2012, Faith gave about 60 concerts in Russia and Ukraine. The group became a participant in the anniversary festival Invasion in 2011 and was one of the headliners of the festival More Amore in 2012. That year, they opened with the performance Festival of Festivals on Poklonnaya Hill in Moscow in honor of the Day (2012). It was nominated for the Steppenwolf independent music award. In October 2011, the club Sixteen Tons handed skid and its Group Award Golden Gargoyle for the album Sign of inequality. The music of the album has changed and is appended during this time. The summer of 2012 double album Sign of inequality was recorded at Victor Bulatov's Music Street Studio. Album presentation was held on 6 November 2012 at the Moscow Mayakovsky Theatre and went to re sold out.

In January 2013, the premiere of the first clip of the skid for a song from the album Sign of inequality of Evening. The operator and the director of the clip was Sergey Sarahanov.

In February 2013, the clip joint skid of Polozkova and Svetlana Surganova Gertruda debuted.

Polozkova is one of the heroines of the book of journalist and poet Yulia Idlis, Runet. The created idols, published in 2010. The protagonists were- the eight most celebrated Russian bloggers.

After the 2022 Russian invasion of Ukraine, she emigrated from Russia to Cyprus and branded Russian president Vladimir Putin the “main maniac of the 21st century”.

== Recognition ==
- Rimma Kazakova Prize (2011)
- Snob Magazine award Made in Russia in the category Literature for the synthesis of the literature with other arts (nominated, 2021)
- Parabola Award (2013)

== Personal life ==
On 9 August, 2014, Polozkova married musician Alexander Bgantsev. Their son Fyodor was born on 29 December, 2014. They divorced in 2019. Polozkova has spoken about having body dysmorphic disorder.
