= Lahda, the Russian Musical Dramatic Art Society =

Russian Musical Dramatic Art Society

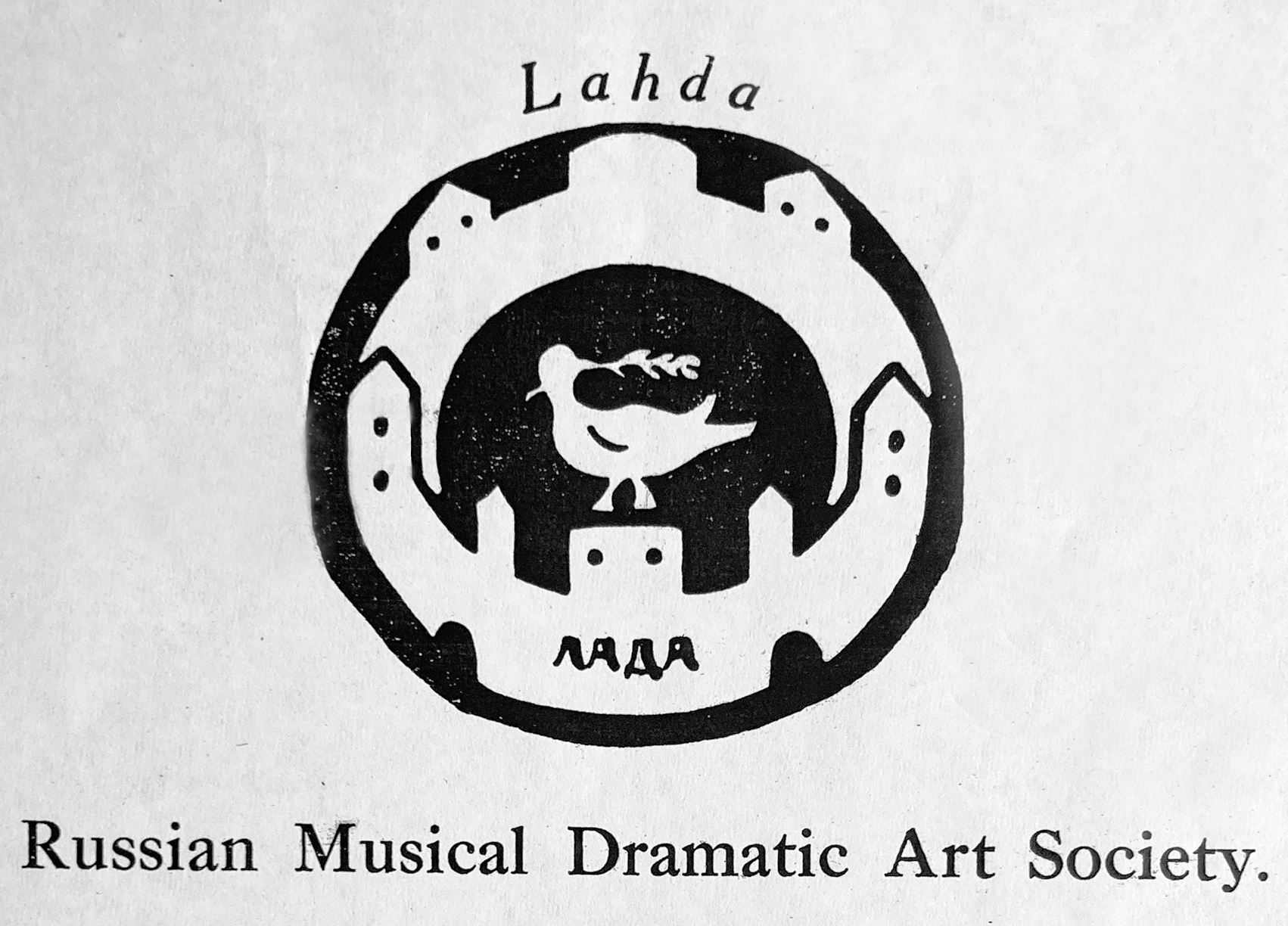
LAHDA's Logo. London, 1920.

LAHDA, the Russian Musical Dramatic Art Society, was a group formed in London in 1919 by director Theodore Komisarjevsky, tenor Vladimir Rosing, and dancer Laurent Novikoff. The purpose of the organization was to “bring closer friendship and understanding” between England and Russia “by means of art and its beauty of expression.” LAHDA also hoped to create needed work for the many talented but struggling Russian artists and performers who had been arriving in London as stateless refugees since the Russian Revolution.

As the London Observer explained, LAHDA is "a ‘portmanteau’ word, which combines the meanings of harmony, beauty, and sound; and its object is to bring Russian harmony, beauty, and sound to our doors, so that, whatever the welter of politics, we may get a glimpse into the soul of Russia by communication with the ideas of a people which live on and for ideas.”

== Members ==
The members of LAHDA represented a distinguished cross-section of modern Russian artistic culture. Komisarjevsky had been directing plays at his own theater in Moscow. Novikoff had trained at the Bolshoi Ballet School and had been a dancer with companies belonging to Sergei Diaghilev and Anna Pavlova. Rosing was a well-known recording artist and recitalist of Russian art songs. Other participants included Diaghilev dancers Tamara Karsavina and Lydia Sokolova. LAHDA's governing Art Council included the Russian-born English conductor Albert Coates and the mystical Russian artist Nicholas Roerich.

In addition to performing, the members of the group offered training to young artists wishing to study in the modern methods of Russian artistic expression. In discussing the formation of LAHDA, the Manchester Guardian wrote, “Russian art has much to give us, not only of chiefly because it expresses in unique and passionate form the character of a great nation, but still more because it has in it the quality of the universal. The Russians love art because it is art. They care so passionately for its form because they know how to value its soul.”

== Performing ==
LAHDA's first performance was at Prince's Galleries in London on 19 December 1919. As with most LAHDA events, the eclectic evening included Russian music, drama, dance, and even comical elements reminiscent of La Chauve-Souris. Performances followed over the next few months at Wigmore Hall Aeolian Hall, and a then full season at the Duke of York's Theatre, which included the premiere of Poldowski's opera Silence. In June 1920, LAHDA staged a Komisarjevsky production of Maurice Maeterlinck's Sister Beatrice at Aeolian Hall. By the end of 1920, LAHDA had rebranded itself as the Russian Association of Representatives of Art and Literature with a headquarters at the Russian Embassy. The organization then presented four evenings of Russian Artists 'At Home' at Prince's Galleries in April and May 1921 which featured dance, Komisarjevsky's Theatre of the Eager Centipede, performances by pianist Alexander Siloti, the Russian Balalaika Orchestra, and even restaurant offerings of popular Russian dishes. Finally, in June 1921 Komisarjevsky and Rosing staged a season of Opera Intime at Aeolian Hall with conductor Adrian Boult, and featured Pyotr Ilyich Tchaikovsky's opera The Queen of Spades along with three other works.
