= Soho Theatre Walthamstow =

Coordinates: 51.5861°N 0.0199°W

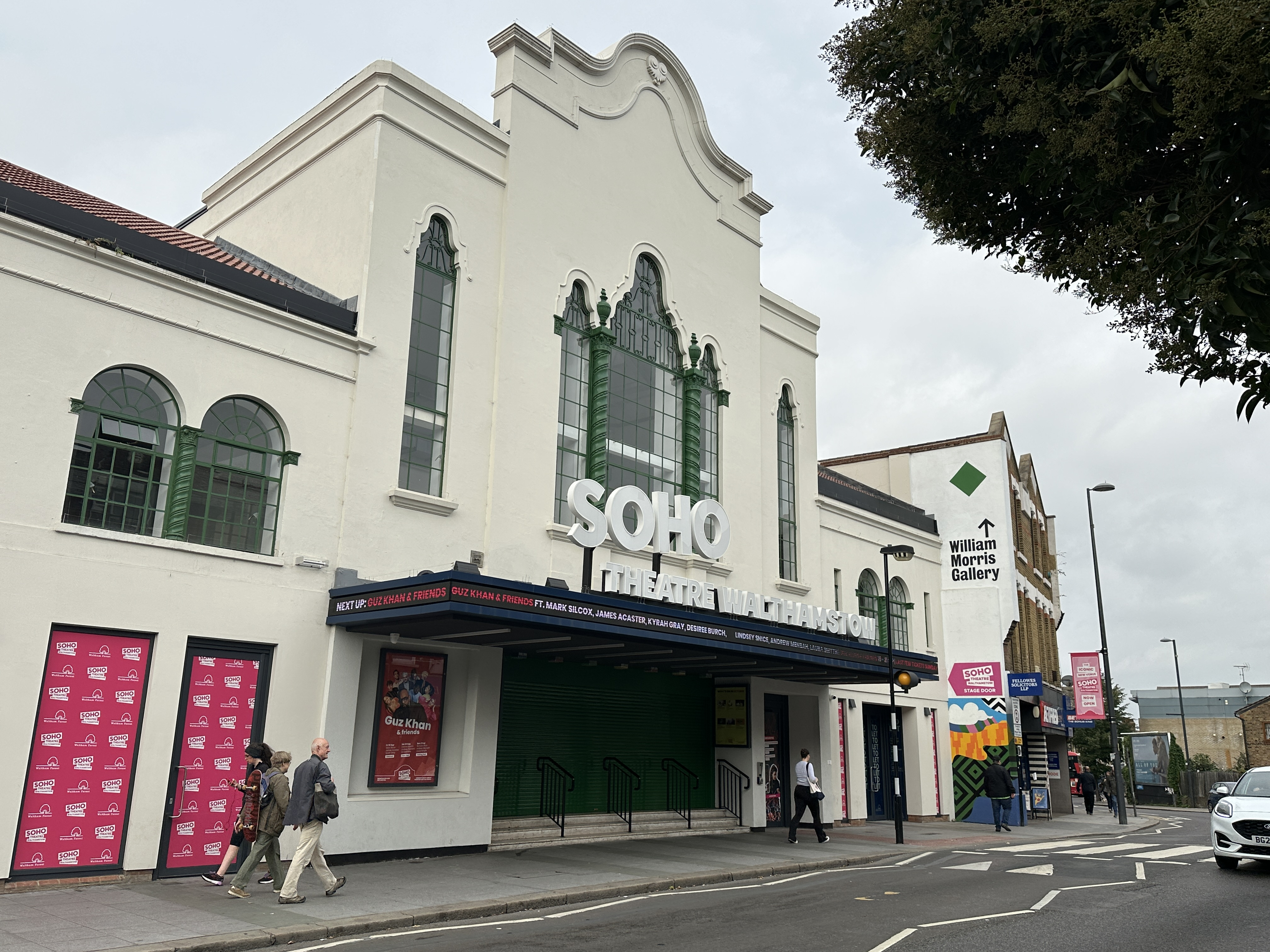
- The building in 2025, as the Soho Theatre Walthamstow
- Former names: Mirth, Marvel & Maud; Walthamstow Granada; Walthamstow EMD; ABC Cinema

General information
- Location: 186 Hoe Street, Walthamstow, E17 4QH, Walthamstow

Website
- Soho Theatre, Walthamstow

Listed Building – Grade II*
- Designated: 1987
- Reference no.: 1065590

Soho Theatre Walthamstow, formally best-known as Walthamstow Granada, is a Grade II* listed building housing a pub, cinema and cultural centre in Walthamstow, London. The building is famous for having been frequented by Alfred Hitchcock during its time as a cinema. It was built on a site where films were shown as early as 1896.

The building reopened as part of the Soho Theatre on 1 May 2025.

== History ==
In 1930 Granada plc built a 2,697 seat cinema, opened as The Granada. The building featured exteriors by Cecil Masey and interior decorations by Theodore Komisarjevsky.

In later years, as a result of changes in the building's ownership, the cinema was variously known as MGM, ABC, and EMD cinema. Although never completely renovated after the 1970s, at the time of its closure as a cinema in December 2003, it was the only cinema to have an original working Christie Organ still in place at the cinema where it was originally installed.

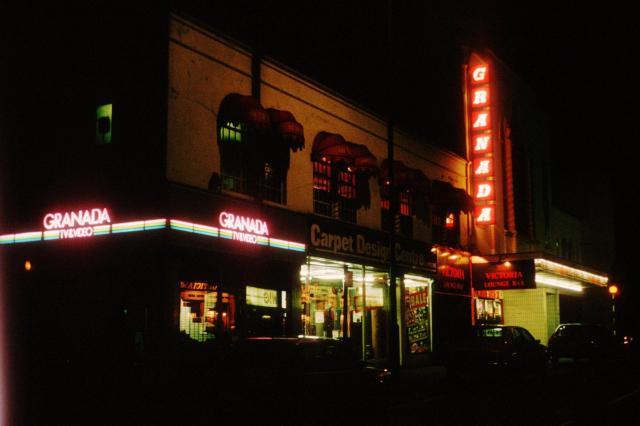
The building in 1989, in its incarnation as the Granada, lit up with neon signs

Often used as a concert venue, the Granada Cinema in Hoe Street, Walthamstow, held a concert by the Beatles on 24 May 1963. Other famous musical acts to have performed there include John Coltrane, Little Richard, Gene Vincent, Jerry Lee Lewis, Alex Paterson and Buddy Holly.

== Campaign to save building and cinema ==
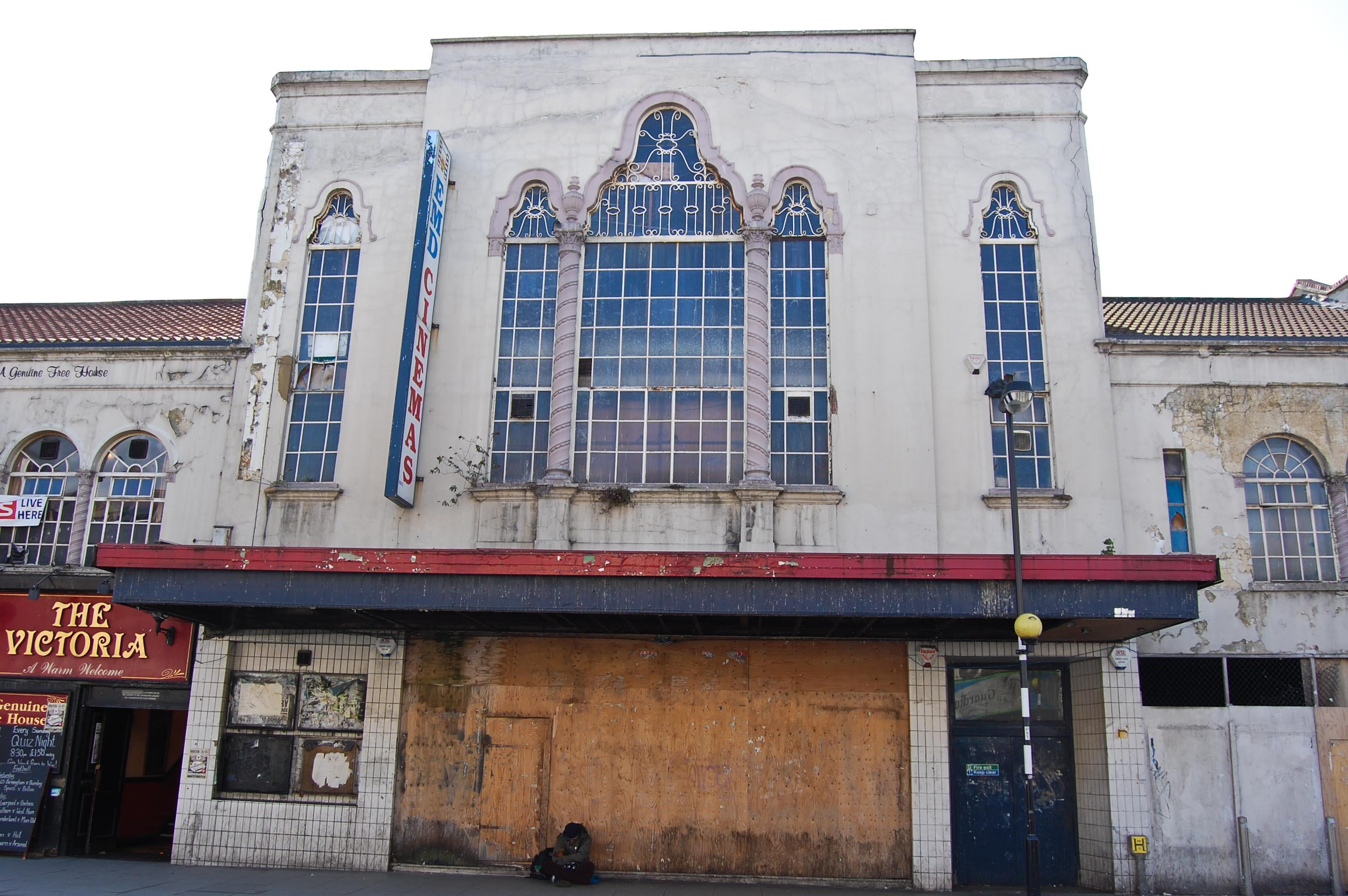
The boarded-up building in 2010, during the period of closure

The cinema closed in 2003 and was purchased by Universal Church of the Kingdom of God (UCKG) with the intention of converting the building into a church.

Many members of the local community opposed and successfully campaigned against these plans. Comedian and presenter Griff Rhys Jones, actor Paul McGann and writer Alain de Botton are among the famous names to have backed local residents in asking the local authority to stop plans to convert the building into a church. The local McGuffin Film Society became the focal point for local campaigners. UCKG failed to gain planning permission to convert the building from Waltham Forest Council and later from the then Secretary of State for Communities and Local Government, Eric Pickles.

== Restoration of the building ==
In 2014, UCKG sold the cinema to pub company Antic who reopened the building under the new name of Mirth, Marvel and Maud.

In May 2019, Waltham Forest Council purchased the building from Antic. Waltham Forest Council and Soho Theatre teamed up to secure the future of the former Granada/EMD, which will operate a new local theatre with a national profile as part of the legacy of Waltham Forest's year as the first London Borough of Culture.

Soho Theatre will operate the building as a new cultural venue for London. The 960-seat rejuvenated venue will operate as a local theatre with a national profile, presenting the biggest names in comedy plus theatre, performance, music, pantomime and community and creative engagement programmes.

Renovation of the site was carried out by Willmott Dixon Interiors, Pilbrow & Partners, Soho Theatre and interior design consultant Jane Wheeler.

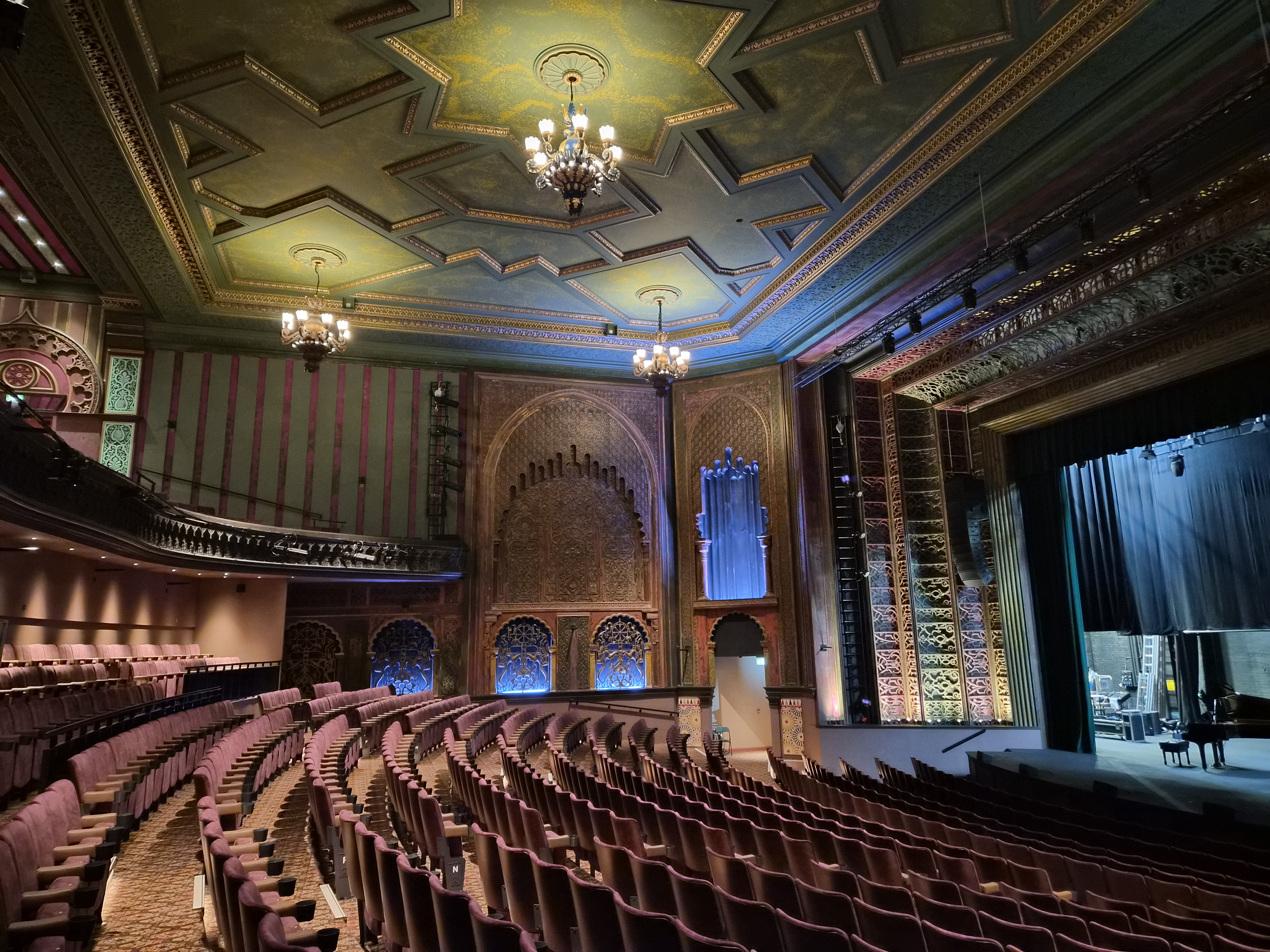
Soho Theatre Walthamstow restored Komisarjevsky Auditorium

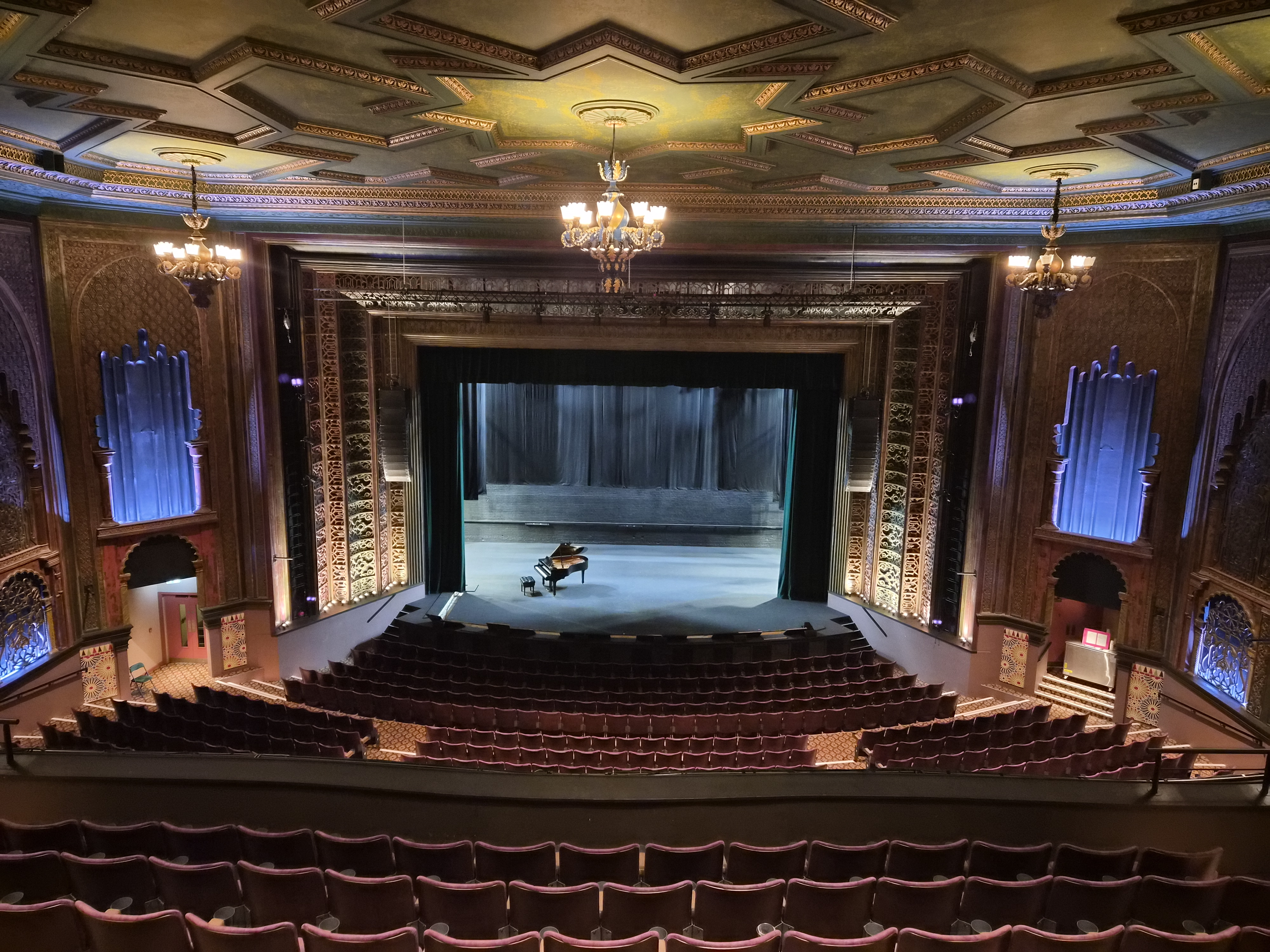
Soho Theatre Walthamstow restored Komisarjevsky Auditorium seating and stage

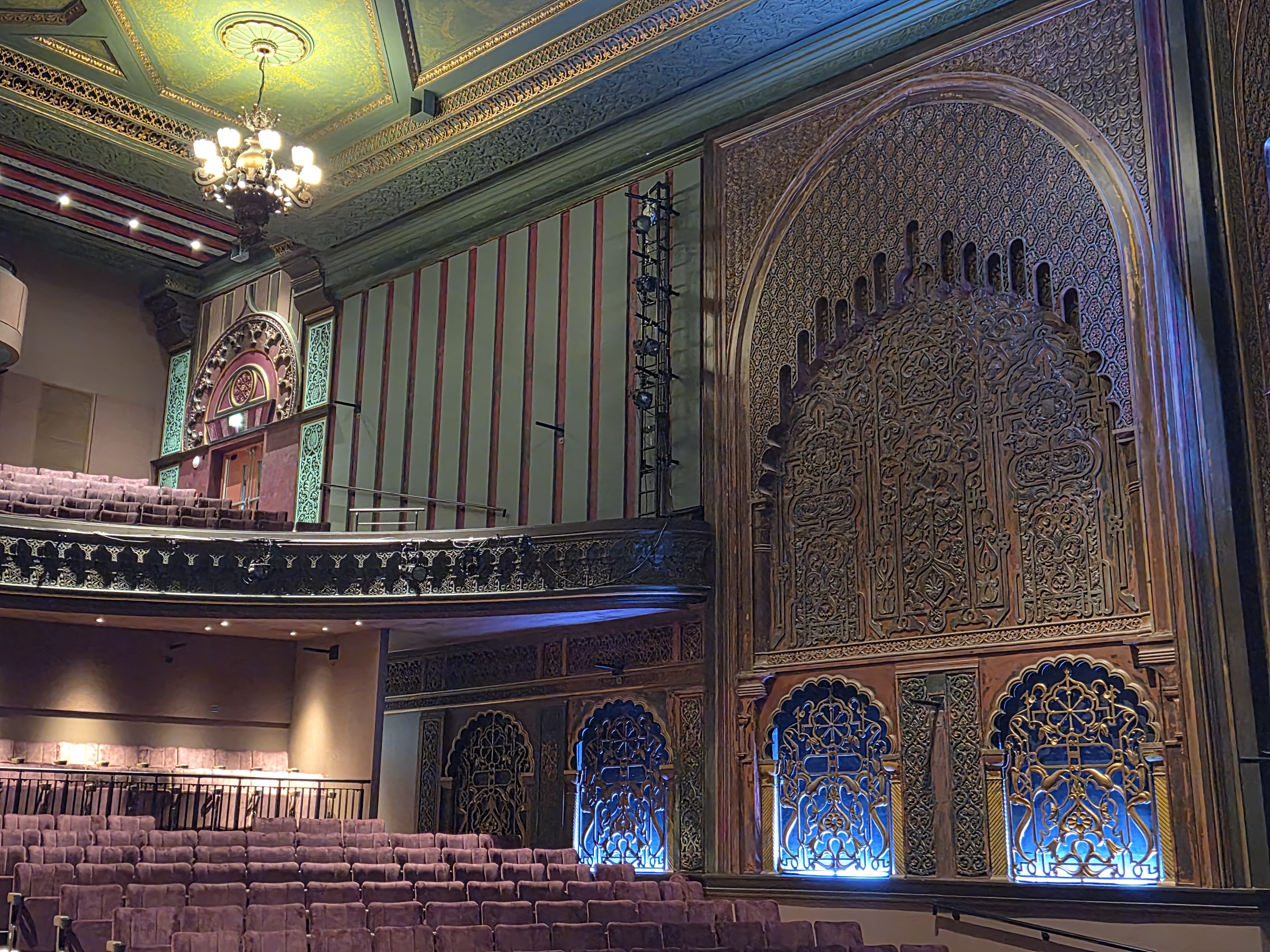
Soho Theatre Walthamstow restored Komisarjevsky Moorish decoration

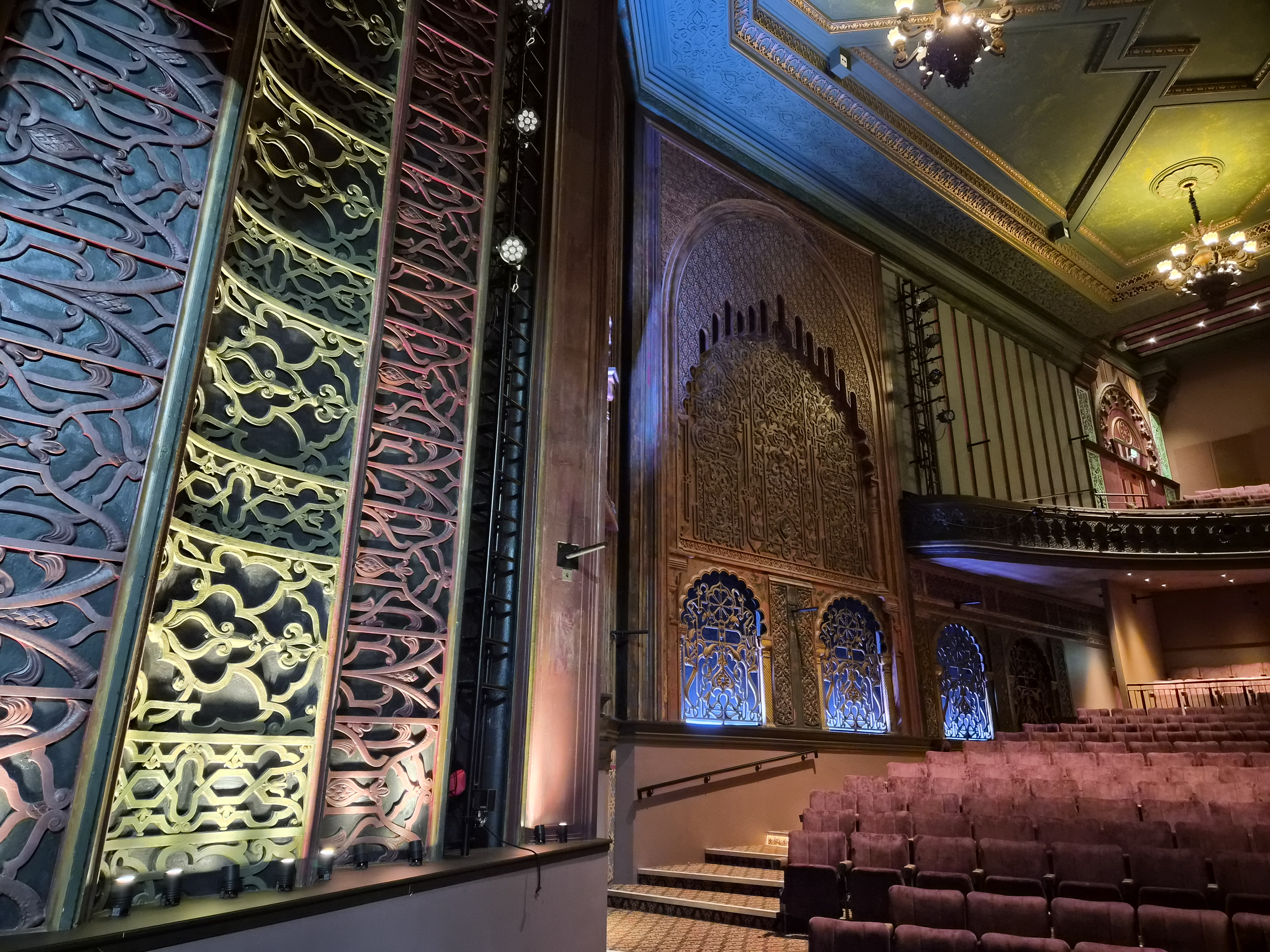
Soho Theatre Walthamstow restored Komisarjevsky Auditorium interior

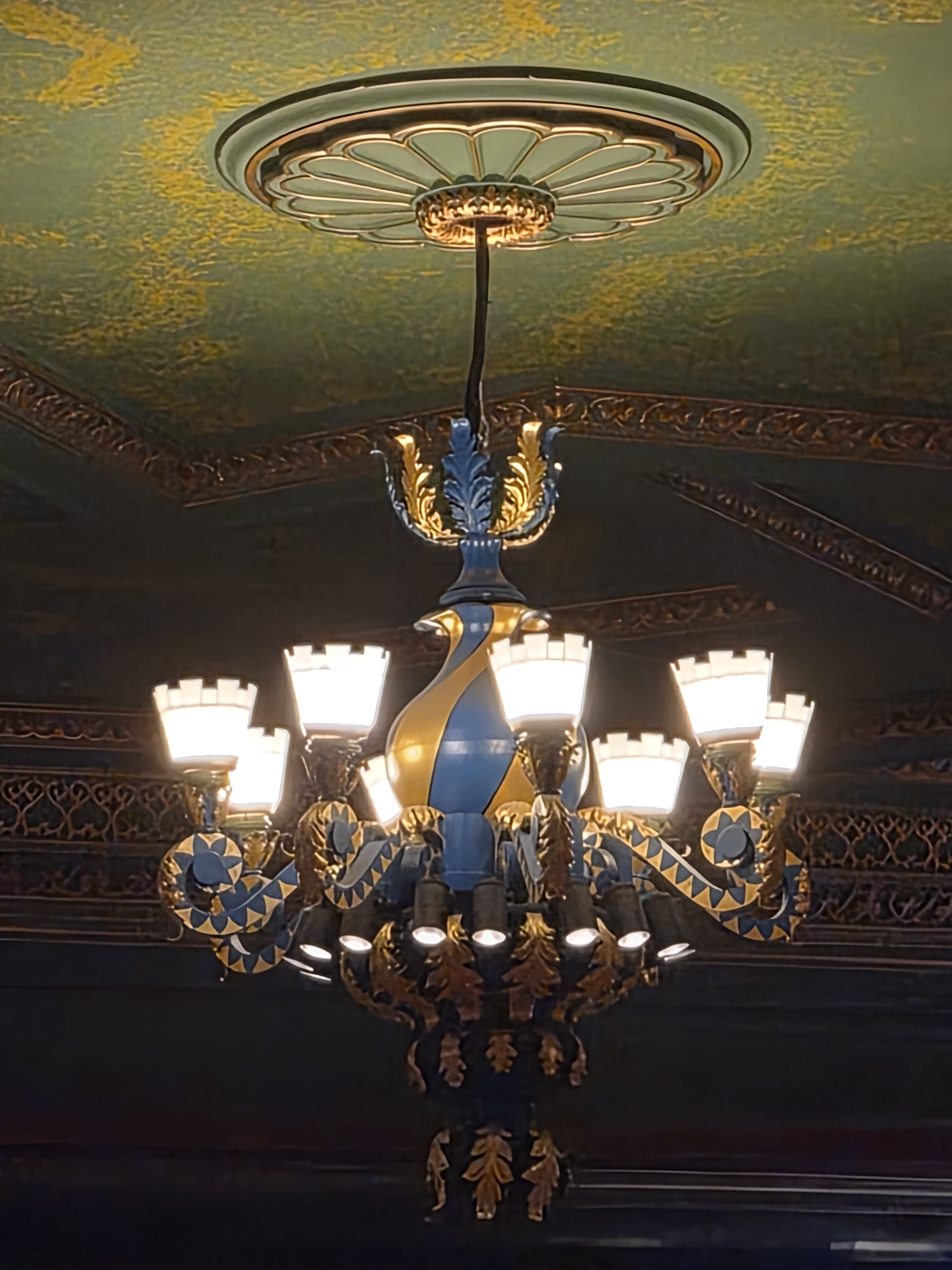
Soho Theatre Walthamstow restored Komisarjevsky chandelier original colours

== Soho Theatre Ownership ==
In 2025, the venue reopened as Soho Theatre Walthamstow, featuring a 960-seat main auditorium, three studio spaces and four bars. It is operated by Soho Theatre, which has run a lively venue in Dean Street, central London, for 25 years. This new site presents a similar mix of comedy, cabaret and theatre including a yearly pantomime.

Comedy will take centre stage in the opening season, with the monthly Neon Nights featuring acclaimed performers including Sara Pascoe, Rosie Jones, Larry Dean, and Phil Wang. Soho Theatre's work as London's leading producer of Indian comedy will be mirrored in its opening season, with artists of South Asian heritage from around the world featuring prominently, including performances scheduled from Rahul Dua and Biswa Kalyan Rath.

Soho Theatre Walthamstow opened with Natalie Palamides' acclaimed show WEER and winter will bring a pantomime to Walthamstow for the first time in over 70 years with Aladdin and The Magic Lamp, directed by Susie McKenna.

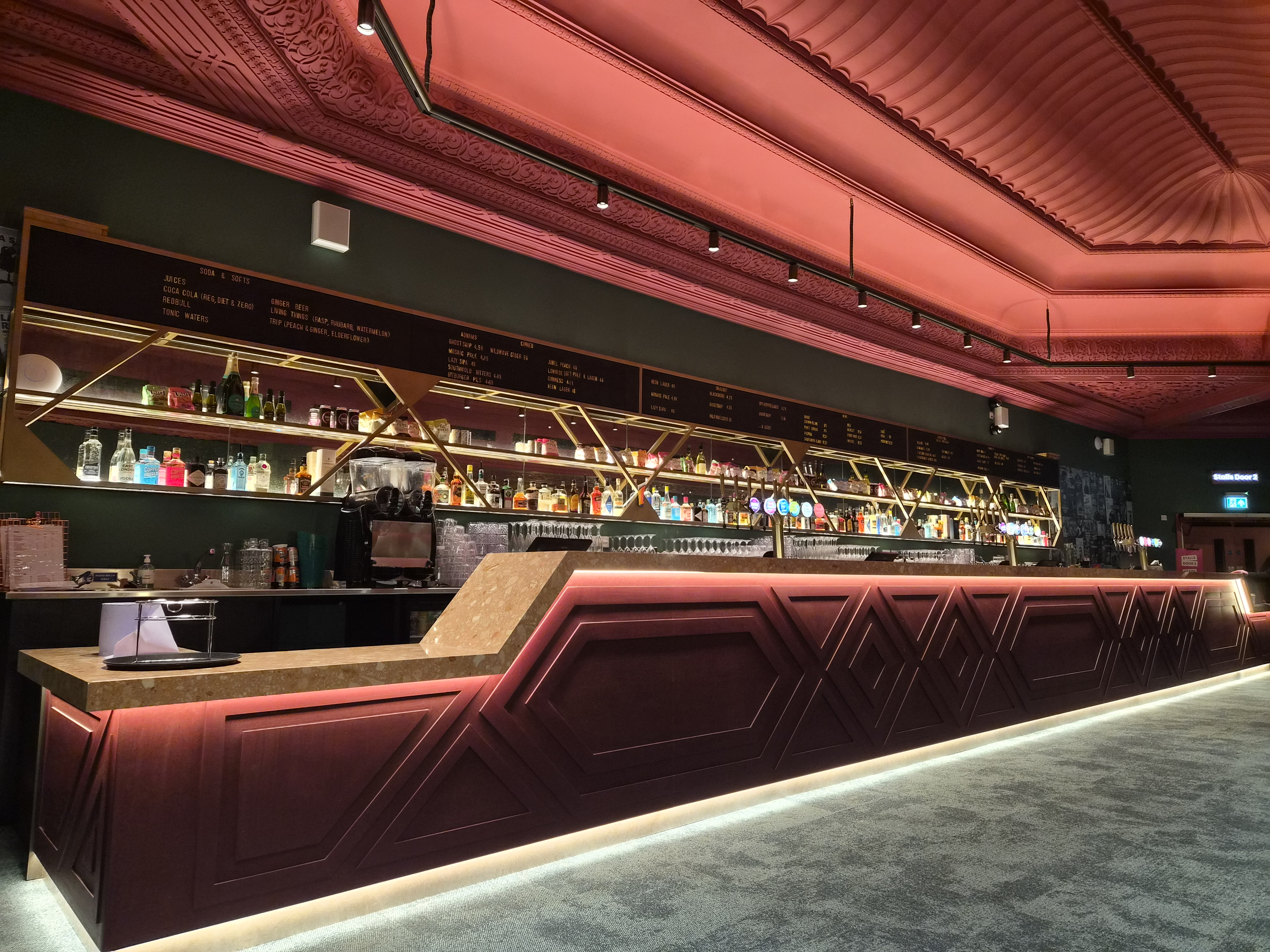
Ziggurat Bar Soho Theatre 10 01 2026
