= Vera Komissarzhevskaya =

Russian actress and theatre patron (1864–1910)

- Вера Комиссаржевская
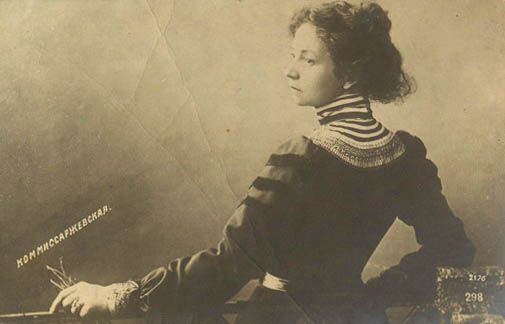
- Born: 8 November [O.S. 27 October] 1864; Saint Petersburg, Russian Empire
- Died: 23 February 1910 (aged 45); Tashkent, Russian Empire
- Resting place: Tikhvin Cemetery, St. Petersburg
- Occupations: Actress; theatre manager

Vera Fyodorovna Komissarzhevskaya (Russian: Вера Фёдоровна Комиссаржевская; 8 November [O.S. 27 October] 1864 – 23 February [O.S. 10 February] 1910) was a Russian actress and theatre manager.

She made her professional debut in 1893, after having acted as an amateur at Konstantin Stanislavski's Society of Art and Literature. She is probably best known today for originating the role of Nina in the ill-fated premiere of Anton Chekhov's The Seagull, at the Alexandrinsky Theatre in Saint Petersburg in 1896. Though the production was deemed an utter failure, Komissarzhevskaya's performance was highly praised.

Later in her career, Komissarzhevskaya became notable for her patronage of the up-and-coming theatre artist, Vsevolod Meyerhold. Following Meyerhold's unsuccessful attempts to stage symbolist plays at Stanislavsky's Moscow Art Theatre, Komissarzhevskaya invited him to try his experiments at her new Dramatic Theatre in Saint Petersburg. During their short-lived collaboration, the two managed to develop Meyerhold's symbolist aesthetic and Komissarzhevskaya herself starred in two of the most critically and commercially successful productions.

== Life and work ==
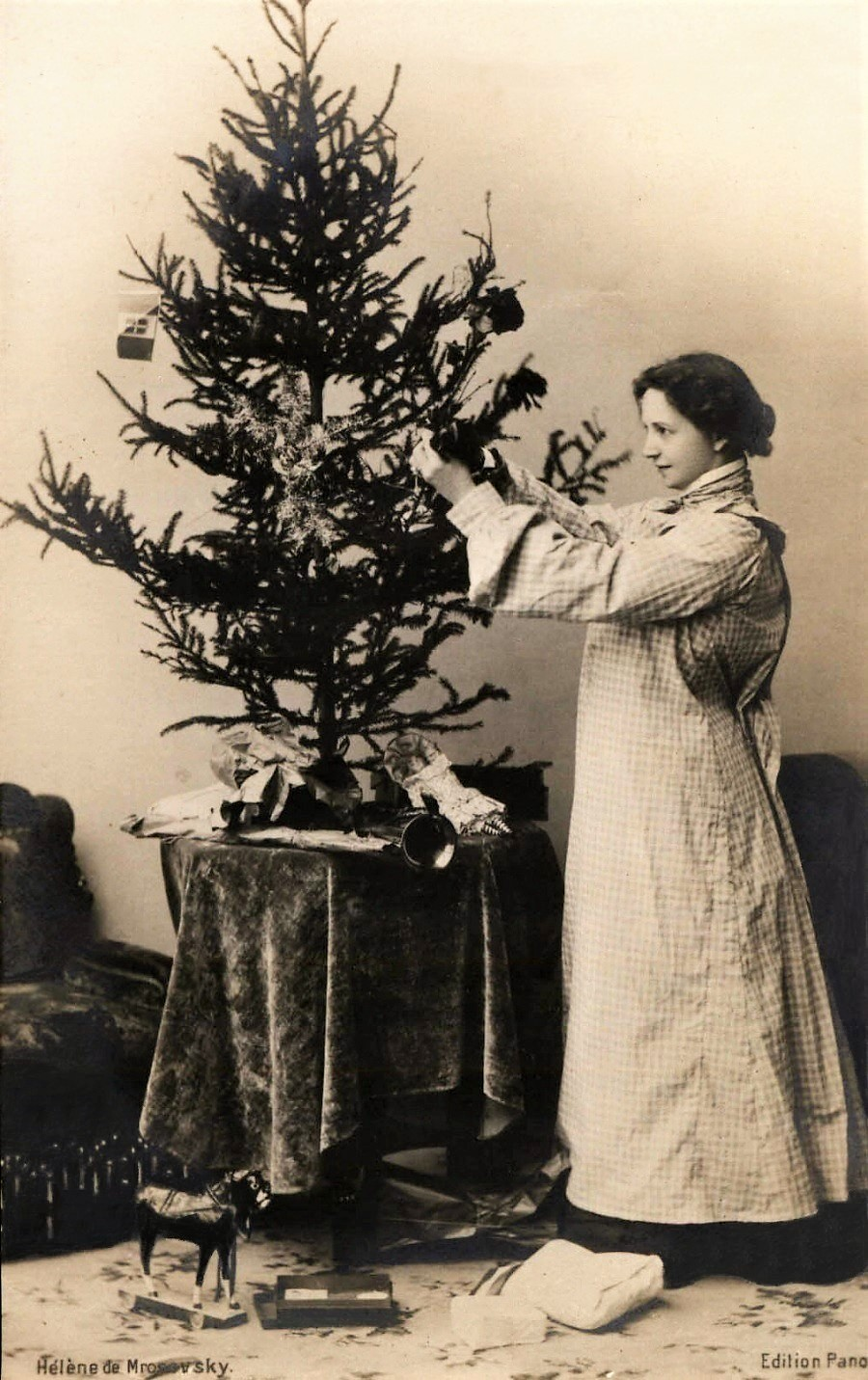
Komissarzhevskaya as Nora, A Doll's House, 1904

Komissarzhevskaya was born in Saint Petersburg, into a wealthy and distinguished family. Her father was the celebrated Russian opera singer Fyodor Komissarzhevsky, a leading tenor at the Mariinsky Theatre, and her mother, Mariya Nikolaevna Shulgina, was the daughter of General Nikolai Shulgin, a war hero and officer in the Preobrazhensky regiment. Komissarzhevskaya had a close relationship with her father, and she frequently corresponded with Komissarzhevsky. Towards the end of his life, he wrote to Mariya Nikolaevna, saying:

Vera!? To say that she is often in my thoughts... would be an understatement, for never a moment passes without my thinking of her! My whole being rests on my feelings and my thoughts about her. She is to my spirit what air is to physical existence! Human being, friend, daughter, sister, family — everything is concentrated in her alone...

This commitment to his daughter's life and work was a testament to her favor, as her half-brother was Theodore Komisarjevsky, a famous theatrical director in his own right. Fyodor actually educated both Vera and Theodore in the art of acting from an early age. Fyodor was a respected acting teacher with many other successful students, such as Konstantin Stanislavsky.

At the age of 19, Komissarzhevskaya married the painter Count Vladimir Leonidovich Muravyov, but preferred to keep her stage name even after the marriage. Some years later, she was broken-hearted to discover that her sister was pregnant with Muravyov's child, and she left him, throwing herself into her acting career. In 1891, she played the role of Betsy in the first Russian production of Leo Tolstoy's The Fruits of Enlightenment under the direction of Stanislavsky. In 1896, she began working at Saint Petersburg's Alexandrinsky Theatre, performing in roles such as Rosy in Battle of the Butterflies by Hermann Sudermann and as Larisa in Alexander Ostrovsky's Without a Dowry. Perhaps her greatest triumph at the Alexandrinsky however, was the role of Nina Zarechnaya in the premiere of Chekhov's The Seagull (1897). The production was initially unsuccessful, with Komissarzhevskaya being heckled by the audience so extremely, that she lost her voice during opening night of the production. However, the rest of the run proved successful, and The Seagull made Komissarzhevskaya a star.

In 1904, Komissarzhevskaya founded her own theatre in Saint Petersburg, where she appeared in productions of Chekhov's Ivanov and Uncle Vanya, and as Desdemona in William Shakespeare's Othello, Ophelia in Hamlet, and Nora in Ibsen's A Doll's House.

Komissarzhevskaya shared prominence with actresses Marriia Ermolova and Marriaa Savina, and although a much less flamboyant personage than colleague theatre entrepreneur Lidiia Iavorskaia, Kommissarchevskias Dramatic Theatres (1904-09) were acclaimed as St Petersburg's practical and theoretical cousin to Konstantin Stalnivisky's Moscow Arts Theatre.

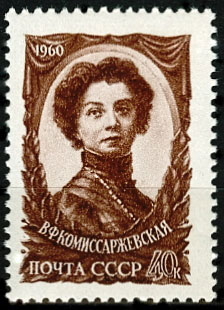
Komissarzhevskaya on a 1960 stamp

Tiring of the nineteenth-century theatre's routine scenarios and the dominant naturalistic trends of the time, however, Komissarzhevskaya boldly extended an invitation to the young director Vsevolod Meyerhold. Though they found some success with Komissarzhevskaya starring in the title roles of Ibsen's Hedda Gabler and Maeterlink's Sister Beatrice, the collaboration proved unfruitful. Meyerhold failed to create a role that catered to Komissarzhevskaya's acting style, a mixture of intense emotional sensitivity with high theatrical seriousness. She dismissed him after just one year, and spent the remainder of her career touring old productions in the United States and Europe, an attempt to raise enough money to pay for the enormous debt she had amassed.

"I am always searching for the new form, the new dramatic idea and the new inspiration."

— Komissarzhevskaya, in an interview with The New York Times (March 1, 1908)

Even after her exit from Russia, Komissarzhevskaya's fame was such that when she died of smallpox in Tashkent on 10 February 1910 (O.S.), her funeral was attended by vast crowds of mourners, and even occasioned some poignant lyrics from the Russian poet Alexander Blok. One of the major theatres of St. Petersburg still bears her name and, in 1980 there was even a biographical film made about the actress' life and career called, Ya - aktrisa ("I am an actress"), starring Natalia Saiko.

Reactions to Komissarzhevskaya's death demonstrate the social importance of ideas of sincere emotion and authentic selfhood as part of a larger search for transcendent individuals in the late imperial public sphere.

Her unexpected death in 1910 became a major public event and media sensation, prompting an enormous outpouring of mourning throughout the Russian Empire and extensive commentary in the press that demonstrated her significant social resonance and place in debates on pressing concerns animating late imperial Russia.
