= Fyodor Petrovich Komissarzhevsky =

Russian opera singer (1832–1905)

Fyodor Komissarzhevsky Фёдор Комиссаржевский
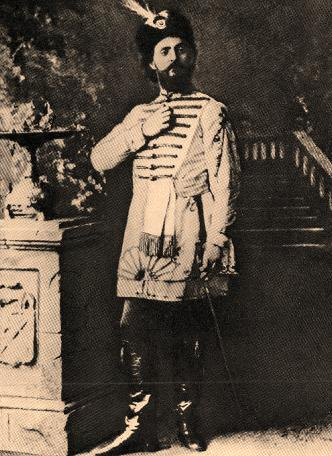
- Komissarzhevsky as the Pretender in Boris Godunov

Background information
- Born: 1832; Kiev, Kiev Governorate, Russian Empire
- Died: 14 March 1905 Sanremo, Kingdom of Italy
- Education: Saint Petersburg University
- Occupations: Tenor; voice teacher; stage director
- Years active: 1860s–1890s
- Spouses: Mariya Nikolaevna Shulgina; Princess Maria Kurtsevich

Fyodor Petrovich Komissarzhevsky (Russian: Фёдор Петрович Комиссаржевский; 1832 – 14 March 1905) was a Russian opera singer and teacher of voice and stagecraft. A leading tenor at the Mariinsky Theatre in St. Petersburg, he created many roles in Russian operas, including the Pretender in Mussorgsky's Boris Godunov and the title role in Tchaikovsky's Vakula the Smith. He had a voice described in the Grove Book of Opera Singers as small but with a "velvety timbre" and as a singer was known for not only for his clear diction and beautiful phrasing but also for his skill as an actor. He was the father of the actress Vera Komissarzhevskaya and the director Theodore Komisarjevsky.

== Early life and education ==
Komissarzhevsky was born near Kiev in 1832. He studied at St. Petersburg University.

== Career ==
He worked in the Russian Department of Taxation. However, after three years and against the wishes of his father, he gave up his career as a lawyer to study singing in Italy with Pietro Repetto. He then sang, under the name "Teodoro di Pietro", in Milan, Rome, Florence and Genoa, as well as in Odessa, Madrid, Barcelona, and even Rio de Janeiro. In 1863, while in St. Petersburg with a touring Italian opera company, his success with the audiences brought him to the attention of the inspectors of the Mariinsky Theatre, who offered him a position as leading tenor with the company.

He took up his appointment with the theatre in November 1863 and went on to create many roles there, most notably, Don Juan in Dargomyzhsky's The Stone Guest (1872), the Pretender in Mussorgsky's Boris Godunov (1874), Prince Sinodal in Rubinstein's The Demon (1875), and the title role in Tchaikovsky's Vakula the Smith (1876). Later Tchaikovsky would dedicate one of his songs to him ("Say of What, in the Shade of Branches" Op. 57, No. 1). At the Mariinsky, he also sang the title role of Wagner's Lohengrin for its Russian premiere in 1873.

Komissarzhevsky remained at the Mariinsky Theatre until 1880 and then moved to Moscow where he sang at the Bolshoi Theatre as well as directing several operas there, including The Magic Flute and Cherubini's The Water Carrier (an opera hitherto unknown in Moscow). Following his retirement from the stage, Komissarzhevsky taught singing and acting at the Moscow Conservatory from 1883 to 1888. Amongst his private students was Konstantin Stanislavski, who had originally hoped to become an opera singer. When Stanislavski founded the Society of Art and Literature in 1888, Komissarzhevsky became the first head of the operatic and musical section of its school. He parted company with the Society after a year and then spent some years at the conservatory in Tbilisi where he taught singing as well as writing reviews. After Tbilisi he went to Italy, travelling around the country until he finally settled in the coastal town of Sanremo. Komissarzhevsky died there on 14 March 1905 at the age of 74 while tending his roses. He was buried in the Protestant Cemetery in Rome where the inscription on his gravestone reads:

"Teodoro Komisarjevsky di Pietro, artist of the Italian opera and the Imperial Opera of St. Petersburg, professor at the Moscow Conservatory, and a soldier in Garibaldi's legions, died on the soil of his beloved Italy."

== Family ==
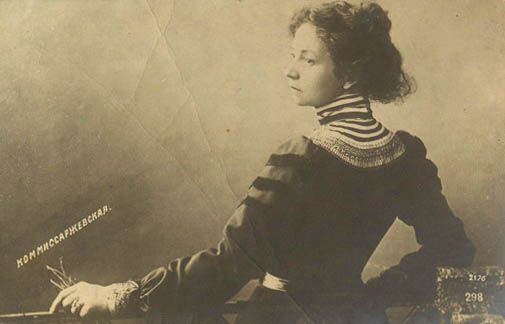
Komissarzhevsky's daughter Vera

Komissarzhevsky's first wife was Mariya Nikolaevna Shulgina, the daughter of General Nikolai Shulgin, a war hero and officer in the Preobrazhensky regiment. The couple met when Mariya Nikolaevna took singing lessons from Komissarzhevsky and married despite her father's opposition. Their first child Vera Komissarzhevskaya, born in 1864 and her father's favourite, was to become a leading Russian actress. Three more children followed, Olga, Nadezhda, and a son Grisha. Grisha drowned when he was six years old. Anton Chekhov later incorporated a fictionalised account of the tragedy in his 1904 play The Cherry Orchard. Vera died of smallpox in Tashkent in 1910, while on a theatrical tour. Olga lived in Paris for a while and became a sculptor of some note. She returned to Russia in 1910 and after 1914 disappeared while serving as a missionary. Nadezhda also became an actress. Known as Nadezhda Skarskaya, she and her husband, the actor Pavel Gaideburov, ran a travelling theatre troupe and a successful theatre in Moscow. She also acted in several early Soviet films and remained in the Soviet Union all her life, dying there in 1958 at the age of 89.

In 1880, Komissarzhevsky had abandoned the family for his mistress, Princess Maria Kurtsevich, who like his first wife had been one of his pupils. By 1882, she was pregnant with their son, Fyodor. His first wife agreed to a divorce as the guilty party so that he and his mistress could marry and their child could be legitimised. Fyodor became a famous theatre director, known outside Russia as Theodore Komisarjevsky.

By the late 1880s Komissarzhevsky's second marriage had also foundered, and he was to spend the rest of his life essentially alone, although he frequently corresponded with his first wife and with his daughter Vera, who would also visit him as much as she could. Towards the end of his life he wrote to her mother:

Vera!? To say that she is often in my thoughts... would be an understatement, for never a moment passes without my thinking of her! My whole being rests on my feelings and my thoughts about her. She is to my spirit what air is to physical existence! Human being, friend, daughter, sister, family—everything is concentrated in her alone...

Fyodor's younger brother Nikolai, who became a writer, remained in Russia and was executed during Joseph Stalin's Great Purge in 1938.

== Death ==
He died in 1905 in Sanremo, Italy, at the age of 73.

== Sources ==
- Borovsky, Victor, A Triptych from the Russian Theatre: An Artistic Biography of the Komissarzhevskys, C. Hurst & Co. Publishers, 2001. ISBN 1-85065-412-3
- Carnegy, Patrick, Wagner and the Art of the Theatre, Yale University Press, 2006. ISBN 0-300-10695-5
- Semeonoff, Boris, "Komissarzhevsky, Fyodor Petrovich", The Grove Book of Opera Singers, Laura Macy (ed), Oxford University Press, 2008, p. 253. ISBN 0-19-533765-4
- Swift, Eugène Anthony, Popular Theater and Society in Tsarist Russia , University of California Press, 2002. ISBN 0-520-22594-5
- Sylvester, Richard D., Tchaikovsky's Complete Songs, Indiana University Press, 2004. ISBN 0-253-21676-1
