= Alexander F. Gavrilov =

Russian literary critic and editor (born 1970)

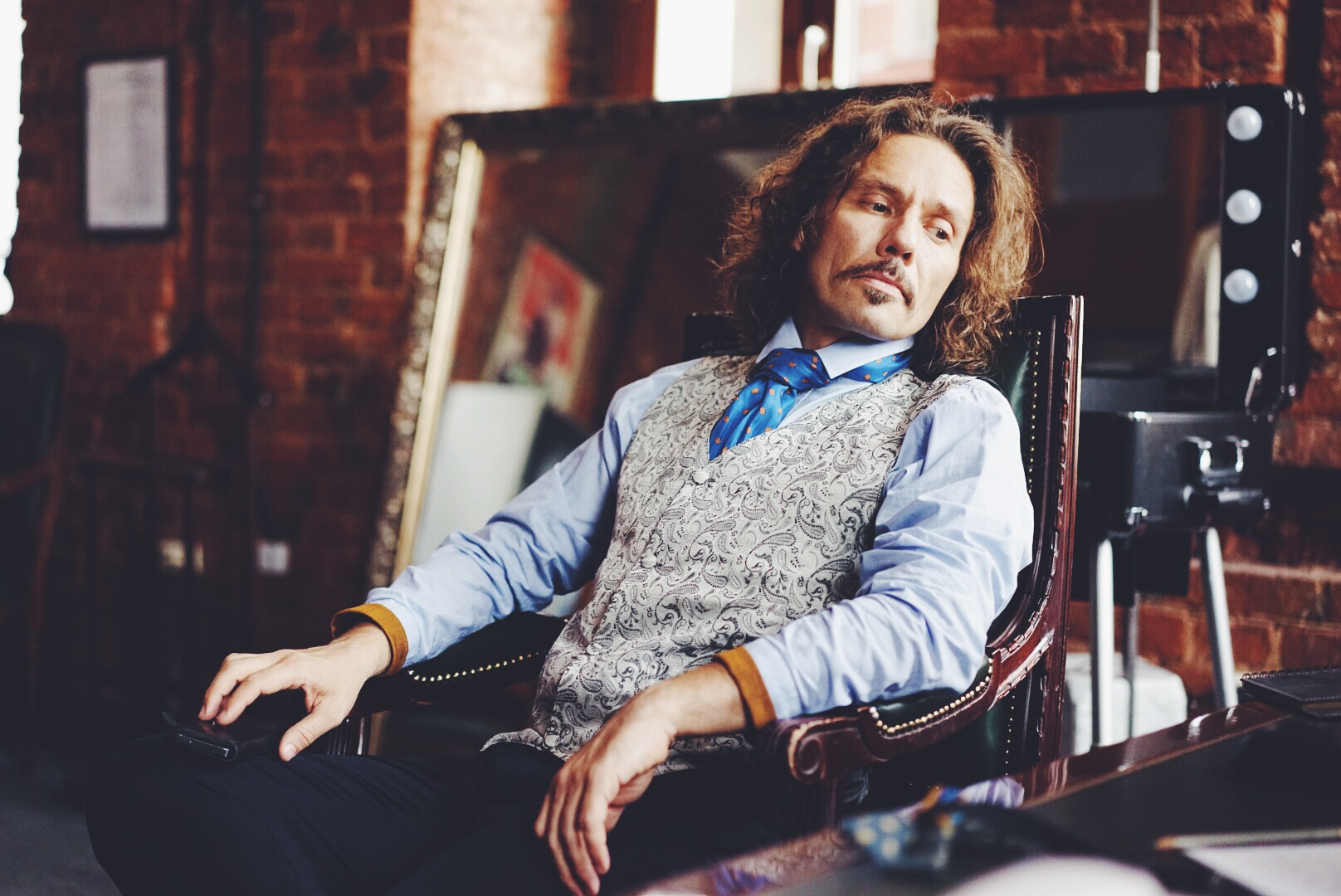
Alexander Feliksovich Gavrilov

Alexander Feliksovich Gavrilov (Алекса́ндр Фе́ликсович Гаври́лов, born 3 December 1970 in Moscow) is a Russian literary critic and editor. He was editor-in-chief of the Книжное обозрение Book Review from 2000 to 2010.

He was a finalist in the Young Creative Entrepreneur program of the British Council.

On Lviv Publishers' Forum, 12 September 2008
