= Laurent Novikoff =

Russian ballet dancer (1888–1956)

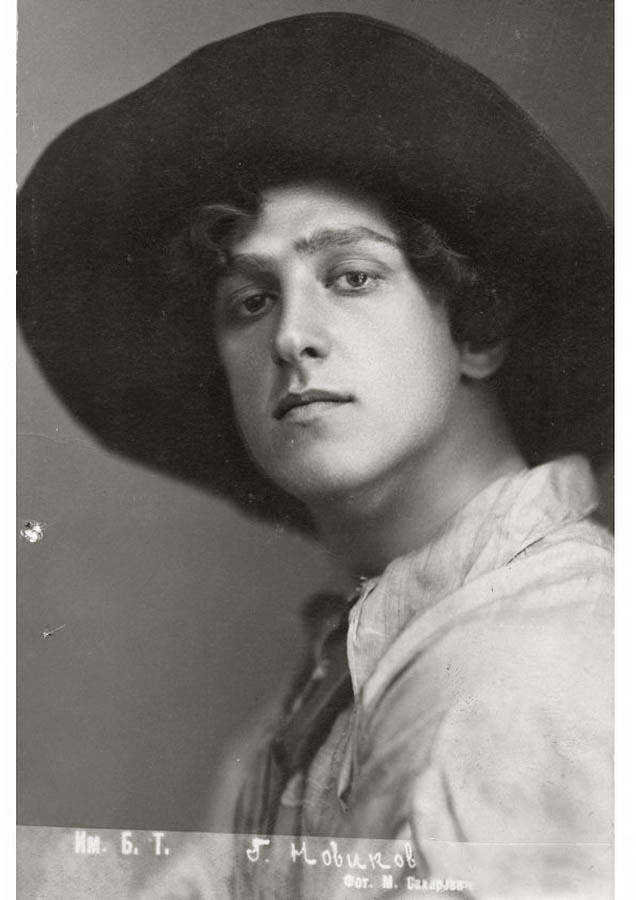
- Born: 24 July 1888; Moscow, Russia
- Died: 18 July 1956 (aged 67); New Buffalo, Michigan, U.S.

Laurent Novikoff (Russian: Лаврентий Лаврентьевич Новиков; 1888 – June 18, 1956), also known as Laurent Novikov, was a Russian ballet dancer who became a citizen of the United States in 1939.

== Biography ==
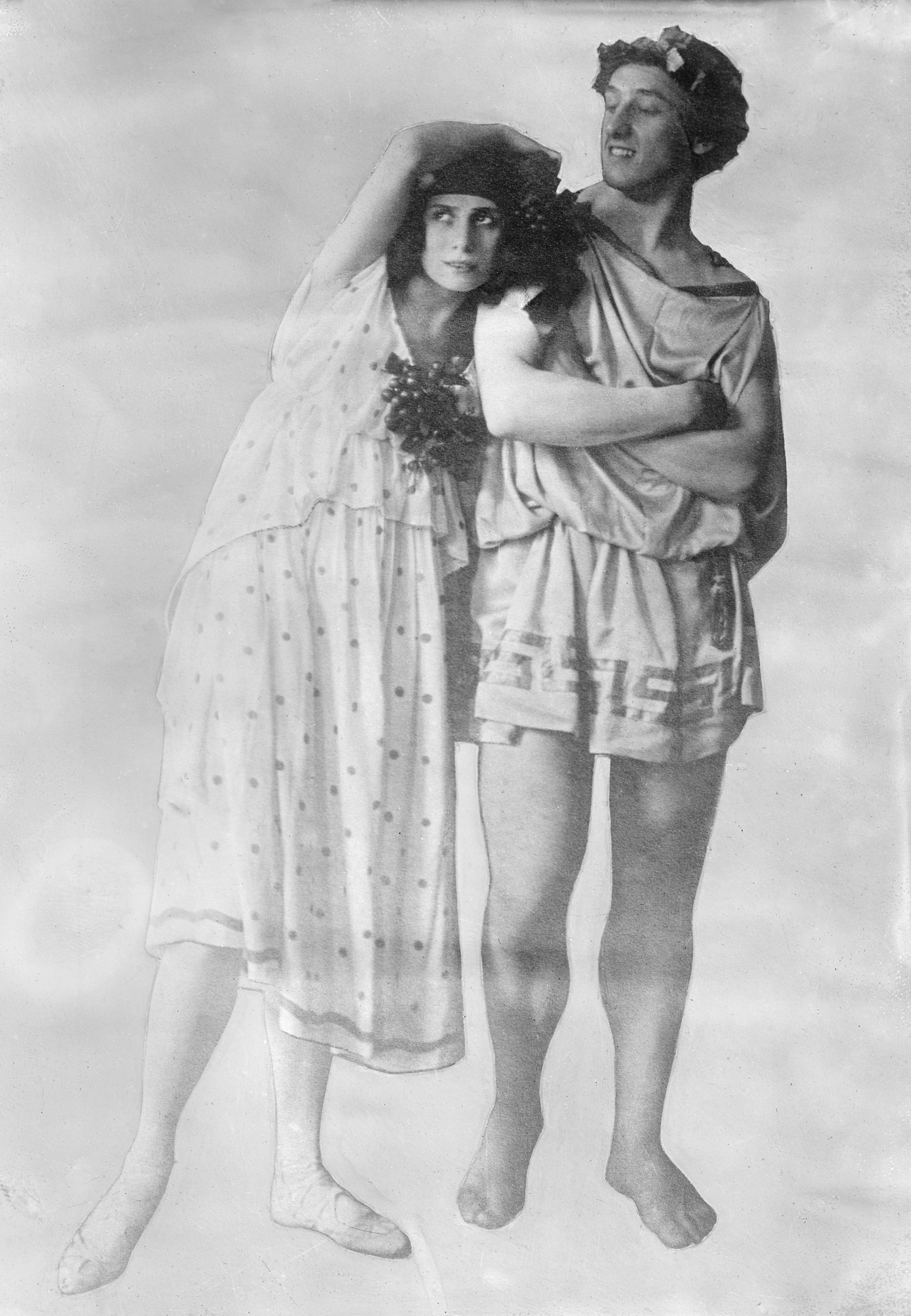
Anna Pavlova and Novikoff in 1911

He graduated from Moscow's Bolshoi Ballet School in 1906. He danced with Diaghilev in 1909 and again from 1919 to 1921, then with Pavlova's company from 1911 to 1914 and again from 1921 to 1928. He became the ballet master at the Chicago Opera from 1929 to 1933. He danced at the Metropolitan Opera in New York City from 1941 to 1945.

He opened a ballet school in New Buffalo, Michigan, and died there in 1956.
